= 2007 Challenge Cup =

Rugby league competition

2007 Carnegie Challenge Cup
- Duration: 9 Rounds
- Highest attendance: 84,241
- Broadcast partners: (United Kingdom) BBC Sport
- Winners: St. Helens
- Runners-up: Catalans Dragons
- Biggest home win: Castleford Tigers 88–10; Castleford Lock Lane
- Biggest away win: Normanton Knights 10–78; Widnes Vikings
- Lance Todd Trophy: Paul Wellens; Leon Pryce

The 2007 Carnegie Challenge Cup began in February 2007. The Challenge Cup is the most prestigious knock-out competition in the world of rugby league, featuring teams from across Europe including England, Scotland, Wales, France and Russia.

In 2007 the preliminary round was dropped, reducing the number of amateur clubs involved. Teams from the National League were given byes to round three, and teams from the Super League entered in round four. Teams from outside the UK were introduced at various stages.

St. Helens successfully defended their title after beating Catalans Dragons (who were the first French club ever to take part in the competition's final) 30 – 8 in the final at the new Wembley Stadium on 26 August.

== Round 1 ==
(week ending 4 February)

Teams came from the National Conference League, Rugby League Conference, Student Rugby League, Pennine League, North West Counties, Yorkshire League, CARLA, Hull & District League and the Armed Forces. This round consisted entirely of amateur teams. Fife Lions, the only Scottish club in the tournament, were eliminated.

Tie no	Home team	Score	Away team
1	Rochdale Mayfield	50–16	Millom
2	Saddleworth Rangers	34–20	Halton Simms Cross
3	Thornhill Trojans	58–18	South London Storm
4	Eccles & Salford	20–2	Blackbrook
5	Royal Navy	30–28	Waterhead
6	Siddal	18–14	York Acorn
7	Bradford Dudley Hill	42–4	Brighouse Rangers
8	The Army	20–28	Leigh Miners Rangers
9	Eastmoor Dragons	28–6	Shaw Cross Sharks ARLFC
10	East Leeds	56–0	Warrington Wizards
11	Wath Brow Hornets	22–26	Oulton Raiders
12	Seaton Rangers	50–10	Queens RLFC
13	Heworth	10–36	Hull Isberg
14	Drighlington	44–0	Askam
15	Skirlaugh	74–0	Milford Marlins
16	Hull Dockers	52–8	Thatto Heath Crusaders
17	Dewsbury Celtic	36–20	Ovenden
18	Crosfields	6–34	West Bowling
19	Egremont Rangers	34–18	Oldham St Annes
20	Wigan St Patricks	28–38	Leeds Metro. University
21	Ince Rose Bridge	12–35	Widnes St Maries
22	Royal Air Force	0–42	East Hull
23	West Hull	38–12	Castleford Panthers
24	Hull Victoria	14–44	Castleford Lock Lane
25	Stanningley	20–36	Leigh East
26	Bramley Buffaloes	12–18	Wigan St Judes
27	Normanton Knights	46–8	Fife Lions

== Round 2 ==
(week ending 25 February)

Russian team Kazan Arrows entered the competition. Castleford Lock Lane defeated Bradford Dudley Hill after extra time in the closest game of this round, which against consisted of amateur teams.

Tie no	Home team	Score	Away team
1	Bradford Dudley Hill	26–28	Castleford Lock Lane
2	East Hull	50–4	Dewsbury Celtic
3	Eccles & Salford	40–28	Egremont Rangers
4	Leigh East	10–25	Oulton Raiders
5	Leigh Miners Rangers	34–18	Leeds Metro. University
6	Rochdale Mayfield	50–0	East Leeds
7	Royal Navy	26–28	Normanton
8	Saddleworth	21–14	Siddal
9	Thornhill	38–20	Kazan Arrows
10	West Hull	23–16	Skirlaugh
11	Widnes St Maries	22–6	Hull Isberg
12	Wigan St Judes	22–30	Drighlington

== Round 3 ==
(week ending 11 March)

Teams from National League Two, National League One entered at this stage, as did three teams from France and Lokomotiv Moscow from Russia.

Lokomotiv's defeat ended the competition for Russian teams. The Castleford derby was a highlight of the draw, though the professional Castleford Tigers defeated their amateur neighbours. 2005 semi-finalists Toulouse failed to win at York, though Pia's victory against Blackpool ensured that one team from the French Rugby League Championship progressed. All remaining amateur teams were eliminated.

Tie no	Home team	Score	Away team
1	York City Knights	54–28	Toulouse Olympique
2	Hunslet Hawks	40–22	Rochdale Mayfield
3	Featherstone Rovers	52–10	Drighlington
4	Batley Bulldogs	60–6	Widnes St Maries
5	Whitehaven	24–10	Doncaster Lakers
6	Dewsbury Rams	36–34	Leigh Centurions
7	Normanton Knights	10–78	Widnes Vikings
8	Castleford Tigers	88–10	Castleford Lock Lane
9	Swinton Lions	60–20	Lokomotiv Moscow
10	Workington Town	18–10	Oulton Raiders
11	Keighley Cougars	34–6	Thornhill
12	Halifax	86–12	Eccles & Salford
13	Leigh Miners Rangers	18–46	Sheffield Eagles
14	West Hull	18–70	Barrow Raiders
15	Rochdale Hornets	48–6	Saddleworth
16	East Hull	10–26	Oldham R.L.F.C.
17	Blackpool Panthers	18–42	Pia
18	West Bowling	8–24	London Skolars
19	Celtic Crusaders	50–10	Eastmoor Dragons
20	Gateshead Thunder	38–22	Limoux Grizzlies

== Round 4 ==
(week ending 1 April)

This round saw the teams from the Super League enter. The only all-Super League match saw Warrington defeat Hull KR. Celtic Crusaders' defeat saw the final Welsh team leave the tournament. Once again, however, all games went to form, with no sides from lower leagues defeating a team from a higher league. Pia's defeat saw the French rugby league championship's exit from the Cup.

Tie no	Home team	Score	Away team
1	Keighley Cougars	10–20	Oldham R.L.F.C.
2	Dewsbury Rams	28–46	Sheffield Eagles
3	Whitehaven	36–8	Halifax
4	Widnes Vikings	24–34	Wigan Warriors
5	Swinton Lions	14–47	Barrow Raiders
6	London Skolars	4–52	Wakefield Trinity Wildcats
7	Rochdale Hornets	20–16	Celtic Crusaders
8	Huddersfield Giants	74–4	York City Knights
9	Hull F.C.	78–0	Hunslet Hawks
10	Pia	8–64	Harlequins
11	Catalans Dragons	70–12	Featherstone Rovers
12	Warrington Wolves	38–10	Hull Kingston Rovers
13	Bradford Bulls	24–16	Castleford Tigers
14	Leeds Rhinos	72–10	Workington Town
15	St. Helens	78–14	Batley Bulldogs
16	Gateshead Thunder	4–64	Salford City Reds

== Round 5 ==
(week ending 13 May)

No new teams enter at this stage with all matches scheduled to be played over 12 and 13 May. The remaining teams for the 5th round are made up with eleven teams from Super League, three from National League One and two from National League Two.

Tie no	Home team	Score	Away team
1	Whitehaven	14–24	Catalans Dragons
2	Warrington Wolves	48–16	Barrow Raiders
3	Leeds Rhinos	18–22	Wigan Warriors
4	Hull F.C.	44–6	Sheffield Eagles
5	Salford City Reds	10–36	Huddersfield Giants
6	St. Helens	70–10	Rochdale Hornets
7	Oldham R.L.F.C.	6–66	Harlequins
8	Wakefield Trinity Wildcats	4–14	Bradford Bulls

== Quarter-finals ==
8 June 2007

Wigan Warriors	25–6	Harlequins
Try: Ashton; Richards; Calderwood; O'Loughlin; Goal: Richards (4); Drop: Barrett	(Report)	Try: Bannister, Goal: Sykes

JJB Stadium, Wigan
Attendance: 10,835
Referee: Ben Thaler

9 June 2007

St. Helens	25–14	Warrington Wolves
Try: Gilmour (2) 1', 60'; Talau 42'; Gardner 50'; Roby 77'; Goal: Wellens (2); Drop: Long 72'	(Report)	Try: Penny 28'; Fa'afili 31'; Goal: Briers (3)

Knowsley Road, St. Helens
Attendance: 8,503
Referee: Richard Silverwood

10 June 2007

Bradford Bulls	52–20	Huddersfield Giants
Try: B. Harris (2); Solomona; Ian Henderson; St Hilaire; Burgess; Tupou (2); Newton; Goal: Deacon (8)	(Report)	Try: Nero; Lolesi; Paul; Hudson; Goal: Drew (2)

Grattan Stadium, Bradford
Attendance: 7,811
Referee: Phil Bentham

10 June 2007

Hull F.C.	23–26	Catalans Dragons
Try: Briscoe; King; Domic; Goal: Tickle (5); Drop: Horne	(Report)	Try: Mogg (2); Wilson; Greenshields; Goal: Bosc (4); Drop: Guisset; Bosc

KC Stadium, Hull
Attendance: 7,441
Referee: Ashley Klein

== Semi-finals ==
28 July 2007

Bradford Bulls	14–35	St. Helens
Try: Evans 16' m Tupou 55' m Vagana 67' c Goal: Deacon	(Report)	Try: Talau 4' c Meli 21' m Gidley 34' c Clough 58' c Pryce 69' c Bennett 75' c Goal: Long (4); Wellens; Drop: Long 40'

Galpharm Stadium, Huddersfield
Attendance: 14,316
Referee: Richard Silverwood

29 July 2007

Wigan Warriors	24–37	Catalans Dragons
Try: Leuluai 35' c Higham 54' c Goulding 64' c Calderwood 68' c Goal: Richards (4); Drop:	(Report)	Try: McGuire (2) 4' c, 8' c Mogg 12' c Duport (2) 17' m, 49' c Croker 72' c Goal: Jones (6); Drop: Jones 52'

Halliwell Jones Stadium, Warrington
Attendance: 10,218
Referee: Steve Ganson

== Final ==
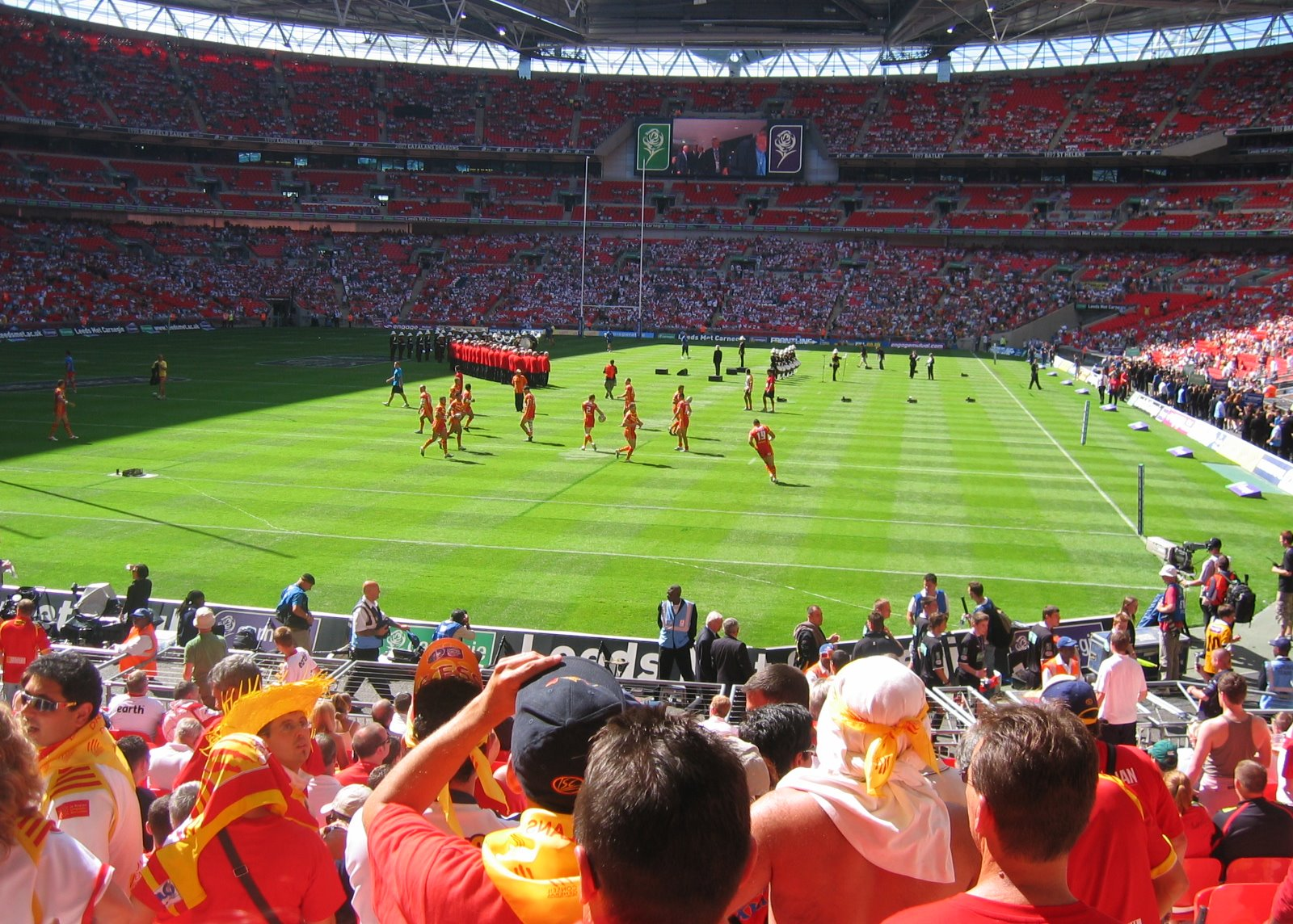
Pre-match at the 2007 Challenge Cup Final

25 August 2007

St. Helens	30–8	Catalans Dragons
Tries: Roby 33'; Gardner (2) 40' and 78'; Wellens 46'; Clough 50'; Goals: Long (5)	(Report)	Tries: Khattabi 35'; Murphy 56'

Wembley Stadium, London
Attendance: 84,241
Referee: Ashley Klein

== UK Broadcasting rights ==
The tournament was screened in the United Kingdom by the BBC.

Round	BBC live match
Round 4	
Round 5	
Quarter-finals	
Semi-finals	Bradford Bulls v St. Helens; Wigan Warriors v Catalans Dragons
Final	St. Helens v Catalans Dragons
