= 2013 Challenge Cup =

Rugby league competition

2013 Tetley's Challenge Cup
- Duration: 10 Rounds
- Highest attendance: 78,137
- Broadcast partners: (United Kingdom) BBC Sport
- Winners: Wigan
- Runners-up: Hull
- Biggest home win: Sheffield Eagles 112-6 Leigh East
- Biggest away win: West Hull 6-82; North Wales Crusaders Gloucestershire All Golds 6-82; Salford City Reds
- Lance Todd Trophy: Matty Smith

The 2013 Challenge Cup (also known as the Tetley's Challenge Cup for sponsorship reasons) was the 112th staging of the most competitive European rugby league tournament at club level and was open to teams from England, Wales, Scotland and France. It began its preliminary stages in October 2012.

Warrington were the reigning champions, but lost 12–16 to Hull F.C. in the semifinal, who would go on to lose the final 0–16 to Wigan.

== First qualifying round ==
The draw for the first qualifying round was made on Wednesday 10 October 2012 at Carrwood Park in Leeds, and took place on the weekend of 27/28 October 2012. A total of 40 teams played in the qualifying rounds. The clubs involved included 22 NCL Divisions 1 and 2, 5 regional league winners, the Yorkshire and Lancashire County Cup winners, 1 Cumberland ARL nomination and the British Police. Also in the draw were the Scottish champions and a Welsh representative, 4 teams from the 2011 Rugby League Conference National, 6 Student teams and a North West League representative. The teams were drawn out by Damian Clayton MBE, the representative for the Armed Forces on the Community Board, and Martin Coyd, the Tier 4 representative. A total of 57 community teams were involved in the 2013 competition which culminated at Wembley in August; the three Armed Services teams and 14 Conference League Premier teams entered the competition at a later stage.

Home	Score	Away	Match information
Home	Score	Away	Date and time	Venue	Referee	Attendance
Featherstone Lions	28 – 14	Stanley Rangers	27 October 2012, 14:00	Millpond Stadium	Paul Ward
Eastmoor Dragons	32 – 22	Loughborough University	27 October 2012, 14:00	Eastmoor Sports and Social Club	Brandon Robinson
Huddersfield Underbank Rangers	32 – 6	Heworth	27 October 2012, 14:00	The Cross Grounds	Jason Woodman
Dewsbury Celtic	16 – 19	Ovenden RLFC	27 October 2012, 14:00	Dewsbury INLC	Paul Stockman
East Leeds	18 – 16	Drighlington RLFC	27 October 2012, 14:00	East End Park	Jonathan Roberts
Bank Quay Bulls	52 – 12	Castleford Panthers	27 October 2012, 14:00	Dallam Playing Fields	Mark Craven
Warrington Wizards	4 – 18	British Police	28 October 2012, 14:00	Wilderspool Stadium	Craig Kay
Askam RLFC	14 – 28	Millom RLFC	27 October 2012, 14:00	Fallowfield Park	Scott Mikalauskas
Blackbrook Royals	22 – 6	Lock Lane	27 October 2012, 14:00	Blackbrook Sports & Recreation Club	Paul Marklove
Northumbria University	16 – 20	Milford Marlins	3 November 2012, 14:00	Cochrane Park	Mark Laing
Stanningley	4 – 40	Widnes West Bank	27 October 2012, 14:00	Arthur Miller Stadium	Gareth Evans
Normanton Knights	48 – 16	York Acorn	3 November 2012, 13:30	Queen Elizabeth Drive	Brandon Robinson
Bristol Sonics	24 – 36	Eccles & Salford Juniors	27 October 2012, 14:00	Aretians RFC	Darren Hayes
Kells	8 – 12	Egremont Rangers	13 November 2012, 19:30	Recreation Ground ^{A}	Chris Kendall
Hunslet Old Boys	18 – 0	St Marys University ^{B}	3 November 2012, 14:00	Hillidge Road	Andy Sweet
Rochdale Mayfield	24 – 0	Hull University ^{B}	27 October 2012, 14:00	Mayfield Sports Arena	Jamie Callaghan
Leeds Metropolitan University	34 – 10	Elland RLFC	27 October 2012, 14:00	Milford Sports Club	Joachim Abimelech
Hunslet Warriors	26 – 22	Wigan St Judes	27 October 2012, 14:00	The Oval	Michael Mannifield
Bradford Dudley Hill	24 – 0	Bonymaen Broncos ^{B}	27 October 2012, 14:00	Neil Hunt Memorial Ground	John McMullen
Shaw Cross Sharks ARLFC	10 – 38	Pilkington Recs	27 October 2012, 14:00	Paul Hinchliffe Memorial Ground	Adam Gill

Notes

A. Game switched to Recreation Ground (Whitehaven).
B. Withdrew from Challenge Cup due to player shortages.

== Second qualifying round ==
The Draw for the second qualifying round was made on Wednesday 10 October at Carrwood Park in Leeds, and the ties took place on 3/4 November 2012. The 20 winners from the first qualifying round were involved with the three Armed Services teams and 14 Conference League Premier teams entering the competition at a later stage.

Home	Score	Away	Match information
Home	Score	Away	Date and time	Venue	Referee	Attendance
Bradford Dudley Hill	68 – 12	Eastmoor Dragons	3 November 2012, 14:00	Neil Hunt Memorial Ground	Jamie Callaghan
Milford Marlins	34 – 4	Ovenden RLFC	17 November 2012, 13:30	Milford Sports Club	Chris Campbell
Rochdale Mayfield	22 – 43	Bank Quay Bulls	10 November 2012, 14:00	Mayfield Sports Arena	Andy Bentham
Pilkington Recs	32 – 12	Featherstone Lions	3 November 2012, 14:00	Ruskin Drive	Mike Woodhead
British Police	10 – 36	Blackbrook Royals	4 November 2012, 14:00	Siddal ARLFC	Craig Kay
Huddersfield Underbank Rangers	6 – 22	Leeds Metropolitan University	4 November 2012, 14:00	The Cross Grounds	Rob Webb
Normanton Knights	18 – 23	Hunslet Old Boys	10 November 2012, 13:30	Queen Elizabeth Drive	Jamie Bloem
East Leeds	26 – 18	Hunslet Warriors	3 November 2012, 14:00	East End Park	Chris Campbell
Widnes West Bank	18 – 6	Egremont Rangers ^{C}	17 November 2012, 14:00	Arthur Miller Stadium
Millom RLFC	40 – 12	Eccles & Salford Juniors	10 November 2012, 14:00	Coronation Field	Craig Kay

Notes

C. Withdrew from Challenge Cup.

== First round ==
The draw for the first round of the 2013 Challenge Cup was held at the RFL's Red Hall headquarters in Leeds on 29 October. The home teams were drawn by Paul Kilbride, a former professional rugby league footballer who has been supported by the RL Benevolent Fund since suffering a serious injury while playing, and the away teams were drawn by Rugby League Cares General Manager Chris Rostron.

The first round took place on the weekend of 1 and 2 December 2012, although the match between Bradford Dudley Hill and Leeds Met was played on 10 November. The match between Millom RLFC and Blackbrook Royals eventually had to be cancelled as the tie had been postponed four times and the away team, Blackbrook received a bye to Round 2.

Home	Score	Away	Match information
Home	Score	Away	Date and time	Venue	Referee	Attendance
Pilkington Recs	18 – 19	Milford Marlins	1 December 2012, 14:00	Ruskin Drive	Jamie Bloem
Bradford Dudley Hill	24 – 28	Leeds Metropolitan University	10 November 2012, 14:00	Neil Hunt Memorial Ground	Chris Campbell
Millom RLFC	w/o	Blackbrook Royals	9 December 2012, 13:30	Fallowfield Park	Curtis Braithwaite
Bank Quay Bulls	17 – 38	East Leeds	1 December 2012, 13:30	Dallam Playing Fields	Dave Sharpe
Hunslet Old Boys	17 – 16 †	Widnes West Bank	1 December 2012, 13:30	Hillidge Road	Michael Mannifield

Notes:
† – After extra time

== Second round ==
The draw for the second round of the 2013 Challenge Cup was held at Millom Rugby League Club on 18 January. The draw involved 14 Conference League Premier clubs, the three Armed Services teams and the five clubs that had progressed from the first round. The balls were drawn by Millom club stalwart Gary Kelly and Workington Town player Peter Lupton, who played for Millom as a junior before signing professional terms at London Broncos. The second round took place on the weekend of 9/10 March 2013.

Home	Score	Away	Match information
Home	Score	Away	Date and time	Venue	Referee	Attendance
Myton Warriors	6 – 4	Leeds Metropolitan University	9 March 2013, 13:30	Marist Sporting Club	Michael Mannifield
West Hull	22 – 12	Hull Dockers	9 March 2013, 14:00	Walter Simpson Park	Greg Dolan
Hunslet Old Boys	24 - 0	Saddleworth Rangers	9 March 2013, 14:00	Hillidge Road	Mark Craven
Leigh Miners Rangers	16 – 6	Milford Marlins	9 March 2013, 14:30	Twist Lane	Neil Aspey
Wigan St Patricks	22 – 24	Thatto Heath Crusaders	9 March 2013, 14:30	Clarington Park	Paul Marklove
East Hull	20 – 28	Siddal	9 March 2013, 14:00	Rosemead Sports Centre	Chris Hancock
Royal Air Force	0 – 20	East Leeds	9 March 2013, 14:00	RAF Cranwell	Tom Grant
Blackbrook Royals	20 – 16 †	Oulton Raiders	9 March 2013, 14:00	Blackbrook Sports & Recreation Club	Phil Graham
Leigh East	28 – 24	British Army	9 March 2013, 14:00	Leigh Sports Village	Mike Woodhead
Royal Navy	4 – 36	Skirlaugh	9 March 2013, 14:00	United Services Sports Ground	John Ashton
Ince Rose Bridge	20 – 10	Wath Brow Hornets	9 March 2013, 14:00	Pinfold Street	Andy Bentham

Notes:
† – After extra time

== Third round ==
The draw for the third round was hosted in the Rugby Pavilion at the home of Oxford RL, the historic Iffley Road sports ground in Oxford on 13 March 2013 at 13:00 GMT. The draw was made by the actor Kevin Whately, who starred in the TV series Inspector Morse and its spin-off Lewis, and Bruce Ray, the communications director of Carlsberg UK, who own the Tetley's brand that sponsors the 2013 tournament.

The third round of the Challenge Cup had the entry of the 23 Kingstone Press Championship and Championship One clubs, which for the first time in the competition, included Oxford, Hemel Stags and the Gloucestershire All Golds.

The third round matches took place on the weekend of 6 and 7 April 2013.

Home	Score	Away	Match information
Home	Score	Away	Date and time	Venue	Referee	Attendance
West Hull	6 – 82	North Wales Crusaders	6 April 2013, 14:30 BST	Wilderspool Stadium^{D}	Dave Merrick	230
Swinton Lions	18 – 56	Toulouse Olympique	6 April 2013, 15:00 BST	Leigh Sports Village	George Stokes	450
Leigh Centurions	50 – 4	East Leeds	6 April 2013, 17:30 BST	Leigh Sports Village	Greg Dolan	728
South Wales Scorpions	22 – 52	Doncaster	6 April 2013, 17:30 BST	The Gnoll	Joe Cobb	456
Batley Bulldogs	72 – 0	Gateshead Thunder	7 April 2013, 14:00 BST	LoveRugbyLeague.com Stadium	Ronnie Laughton	484
Whitehaven	38 – 32	London Skolars	7 April 2013, 14:00 BST	Recreation Ground	Chris Leatherbarrow	440
Ince Rose Bridge	18 – 50	Hemel Stags	7 April 2013, 14:30 BST	Douglas Valley	Warren Turley
Barrow Raiders	28 – 12	Leigh Miners Rangers	7 April 2013, 15:00 BST	Craven Park	Chris Kendall	826
Blackbrook A.R.L.F.C.	24 – 26	York City Knights	7 April 2013, 15:00 BST	Langtree Park^{E}	Peter Brooke
Dewsbury Rams	56 – 6	Myton Warriors	7 April 2013, 15:00 BST	Tetley's Stadium	Chris Campbell	404
Featherstone Rovers	76 – 6	Thatto Heath Crusaders	7 April 2013, 15:00 BST	Post Office Road	Adam Gill	735
Halifax	54 – 12	Oxford	7 April 2013 15:00 BST	The Shay	Gareth Hewer	1,000
Hunslet Hawks	36 – 10	Oldham	7 April 2013, 15:00 BST	South Leeds Stadium	Matt Thomason	326
Rochdale Hornets	40 – 4	Hunslet Old Boys	7 April 2013, 15:00 BST	Spotland Stadium	Dave Sharpe	414
Sheffield Eagles	112 – 6	Leigh East	7 April 2013, 15:00 BST	Don Valley Stadium	Scott Mikalauskas	333
Skirlaugh	16 – 26	Gloucestershire All Golds	7 April 2013, 15:00 BST	Hull RUFC^{F}	Tom Crashley	260
Workington Town	24 – 16	AS Carcassonne	7 April 2013, 15:00 BST	Derwent Park	Jamie Leahy	598
Siddal	14 – 30	Keighley Cougars	7 April 2013, 15:30 BST	Huddersfield YMCA^{G}	Jamie Bloem	521

Notes:

D. Match moved to Wilderspool in Warrington
E. Match moved to St. Helens's Langtree Park
F. Match move to Hull RUFC
G. Match move to Laund Hill

== Fourth round ==
The draw for the fourth round of the 2013 Challenge Cup took place on 8 April 2013 at 15:30 BST at the Halliwell Jones Stadium in Warrington. The draw saw the 14 Super League teams joined by the 18 winning teams from the third round. The draw was made by Rugby League Hall of Fame member Alex Murphy and Bruce Ray, who is Communications Director of Carlsberg UK, the parent company of title sponsors Tetley's and was broadcast on BBC Radio 5 Live. Matches took place on 19, 20 and 21 April 2013 with the Hull Kingston Rovers vs St. Helens match being shown live on BBC One.

Home	Score	Away	Match information
Home	Score	Away	Date and time	Venue	Referee	Attendance
Leeds Rhinos	28 – 12	Castleford Tigers	19 April 2013, 20:00 BST	Headingley	Phil Bentham	8,130
Widnes Vikings	42 – 28	Doncaster	19 April 2013, 20:00 BST	Stobart Stadium	Tim Roby	1,965
Wigan Warriors	60 – 10	Leigh Centurions	19 April 2013, 20:00 BST	DW Stadium	Matt Thomason	6,889
Hull Kingston Rovers	26 – 18	St. Helens	20 April 2013, 14:30 BST	MS3 Craven Park	Richard Silverwood	4,454
London Broncos	24 – 12	Featherstone Rovers	20 April 2013, 15:00 BST	Twickenham Stoop	Thierry Alibert	1,217
Sheffield Eagles	30 – 16	Dewsbury Rams	20 April 2013, 15:00 BST	Don Valley Stadium	Gareth Hewer	467
Hemel Stags	6 – 66	Wakefield Trinity	20 April 2013, 18:00 BST	Rapid Solicitors Stadium^{H}	Peter Brooke	2,456
Hull	62 – 6	North Wales Crusaders	21 April 2013, 13:00 BST	KC Stadium	Chris Leatherbarrow	3,879
Hunslet	12 – 50	Catalans Dragons	21 April 2013, 13:00 BST	South Leeds Stadium	George Stokes	600
Batley Bulldogs	4 – 13	Huddersfield Giants	21 April 2013, 14:00 BST	Mount Pleasant	Ben Thaler	2,067
Gloucestershire All Golds	6 – 82	Salford	21 April 2013, 15:00 BST	Prince of Wales Stadium	Tim Crashley	553
Halifax	52 – 6	Barrow Raiders	21 April 2013, 15:00 BST	The Shay	Joe Cobb	1,110
Keighley Cougars	4 – 74	Warrington Wolves	21 April 2013, 15:00 BST	Cougar Park	James Child	1,413
Rochdale Hornets	10 – 70	Bradford Bulls	21 April 2013, 15:00 BST	Spotland Stadium	Robert Hicks	1,722
Whitehaven	12 – 16	Workington Town	21 April 2013, 15:00 BST	Recreation Ground	Ronnie Laughton	1,600
York City Knights	30 – 28	Toulouse Olympique	21 April 2013, 15:00 BST	Huntington Stadium	Dave Merrick	431

Notes:
H. Match moved to Wakefield Trinity's Belle Vue Stadium.

== Fifth round ==
The draw for the fifth round of the 2013 Challenge Cup took place on Monday 22 April 2013 at 15:30 BST on BBC Radio 5 Live with ex-Wigan player Billy Boston making the draw. Matches were played on 10, 11 and 12 May 2013 with the Huddersfield-Leeds match shown live on BBC One on 11 May.

Home	Score	Away	Match information
Home	Score	Away	Date and time	Venue	Referee	Attendance
Hull	24 – 6	Wakefield Trinity	10 May 2013, 20:00 BST	KC Stadium	Tim Roby	7,697
London Broncos	25 – 16	Bradford Bulls	10 May 2013, 20:00 BST	Twickenham Stoop	James Child	1,237
Sheffield Eagles	28 – 12	Halifax	10 May 2013, 20:00 BST	Don Valley Stadium	Ben Thaler	782
Huddersfield Giants	24 – 8	Leeds Rhinos	11 May 2013, 14:30 BST	John Smith's Stadium	Phil Bentham	11,389
Catalans Dragons	92 – 8	York City Knights	12 May 2013, 15:00 CEST	Stade Gilbert Brutus	Thierry Alibert	3,105
Hull Kingston Rovers	14 – 46	Wigan Warriors	12 May 2013, 15:00 BST	MS3 Craven Park	Richard Silverwood	4,280
Warrington Wolves	52 – 6	Salford City Reds	12 May 2013, 15:00 BST	Halliwell Jones Stadium	Robert Hicks	5,451
Workington Town	0 – 36	Widnes Vikings	12 May 2013, 15:00 BST	Derwent Park	George Stokes	1,657

== Quarter-finals ==
The draw for the quarter-finals took place on 18 May with the draw shown on BBC Breakfast on BBC One by presenters Louise Minchin and Charlie Stayt. Matches took place over four days between 12 and 15 July 2013 with matches on Saturday 13 and Sunday 14 July shown live on BBC Two and the matches on Friday 12 and Monday 15 July shown live by Sky Sports.

Home	Score	Away	Match information
Home	Score	Away	Date and time	Venue	Referee	Attendance
Sheffield Eagles	10 – 29	London Broncos	12 July, 20:00 BST	Don Valley Stadium	James Child	2,459
Catalans Dragons	13 – 24	Hull	13 July, 16:00 BST / 17:00 CEST	Stade Gilbert Brutus	Richard Silverwood	6,500
Warrington Wolves	44 – 24	Huddersfield Giants	14 July, 16:15 BST	Halliwell Jones Stadium	Phil Bentham	7,603
Wigan Warriors	48 – 4	Widnes Vikings	15 July, 20:00 BST	DW Stadium	Ben Thaler	6,327

== Semi-finals ==
The draw for the semifinals of the 2013 Challenge Cup took place on 14 July on BBC Two after the televised Warrington-Huddersfield match on the same channel and was made by Des Drummond and Henderson Gill. The matches took place on 27 and 28 July 2013 at neutral venues.

27 July
17:00 BST

Wigan Warriors	70 – 0	London Broncos

Leigh Sports Village, Leigh
Attendance: 6,274
Referee: Phil Bentham

28 July
18:00 BST

Hull	16–12	Warrington Wolves

John Smith's Stadium, Huddersfield
Attendance: 10,621
Referee: Richard Silverwood

== Final ==
The final of the 2013 Challenge Cup took place on 24 August 2013 at Wembley Stadium with the match kicking off at 15:00 BST. The match was shown live on BBC One with Wigan winning 16–0.

24 August
15:00 BST

Hull	0 – 16	Wigan Warriors

Wembley Stadium, London
Attendance: 78,137
Referee: Phil Bentham

Teams:

Hull: Jamie Shaul, Jason Crookes, Ben Crooks, Kirk Yeaman, Tom Briscoe, Daniel Holdsworth, Jacob Miller, Mark O'Meley, Danny Houghton, Liam Watts, Gareth Ellis, (captain) Danny Tickle, Joe Westerman. Coach: Peter Gentle

Replacements: Richard Whiting, Andy Lynch, Aaron Heremaia, Jay Pitts.

Wigan Warriors: Sam Tomkins, Josh Charnley, Darrell Goulding, Iain Thornley, Pat Richards, Blake Green, Matty Smith, Ben Flower, Michael McIlorum, Lee Mossop, Harrison Hansen, Liam Farrell, Sean O'Loughlin (captain). Coach: Shaun Wane

Replacements: Gil Dudson, Scott Taylor, Chris Tuson, Logan Tomkins.
Tries: Thornley (1), S Tomkins (1) Goals: Richards (4).

== UK Broadcasting rights ==
The tournament was jointly televised by the BBC and Sky Sports on the second of their five-year contracts.

Round	Live match	Date	BBC channel
Fourth Round	Hull Kingston Rovers 26 - 18 St. Helens	April 20, 2013	BBC One
Fifth Round	Huddersfield Giants 24 - 8 Leeds Rhinos	May 11, 2013	BBC One
Quarter finals	Catalans Dragons 13 - 24 Hull; Warrington Wolves 44 - 24 Huddersfield Giants	July 13, 2013; July 14, 2013	BBC Two
Semifinals	Wigan Warriors 70 - 0 London Broncos; Hull F.C. 16 - 12 Warrington Wolves	July 27; July 28	BBC Two
Final	Hull F.C. 0 - 16 Wigan Warriors	August 24	BBC One*

- Except Scotland

Sky Sports televised the other two quarter final matches live. The first on Friday July 12 between Sheffield Eagles and London Broncos and the second on Monday July 15 between Warrington Wolves and Huddersfield Giants.
