= 2014 Challenge Cup =

Rugby league competition

2014 Tetley's Challenge Cup
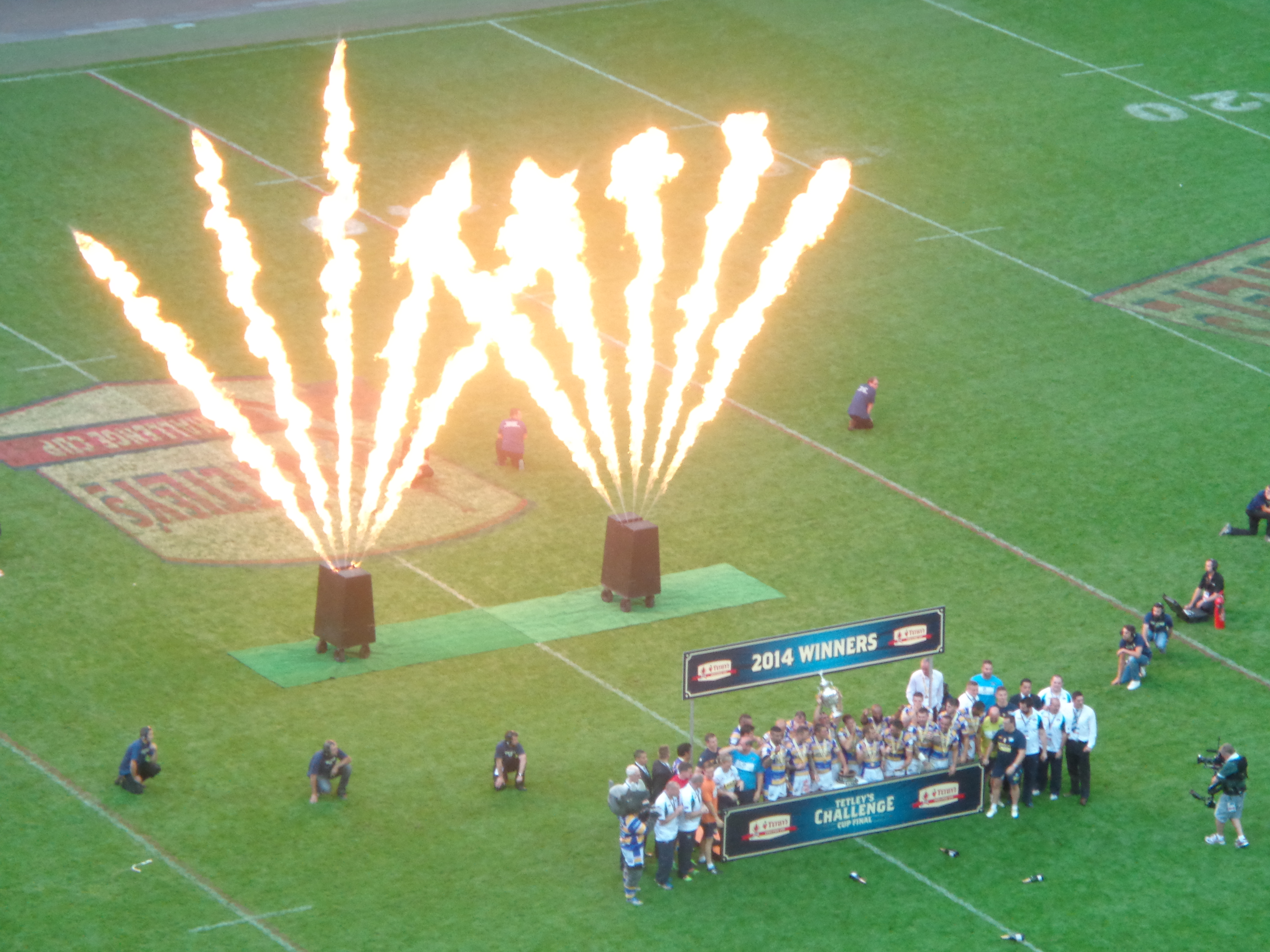
- Leeds Rhinos celebrating their 2014 Challenge Cup victory
- Duration: 8 Rounds
- Number of teams: 81
- Highest attendance: 77,914; Castleford Tigers vs Leeds Rhinos (Final)
- Lowest attendance: 213; South Wales Scorpions vs Hemel Stags (3rd Round)
- Broadcast partners: BBC Sport; Sky Sports
- Winners: Leeds Rhinos
- Runners-up: Castleford Tigers
- Lance Todd Trophy: Ryan Hall

The 2014 Challenge Cup (also known as the Tetley's Challenge Cup for sponsorship reasons) was the 113th staging of the rugby league tournament.

The defending champions Wigan Warriors were knocked out in the quarter finals 4 - 16 at home to the Castleford Tigers, who went on to make the final, but lost 10 - 23 to the Leeds Rhinos.

== First round ==
The draw for the first round of the 2014 Challenge Cup was held on 8 January 2014 and broadcast live from the studios of BBC Radio Humberside by current Hull F.C. prop forward Chris Green and former player Shaun Briscoe.

The first round took place on the weekend of 1 and 2 February 2014, although three fixtures did not take place until the following Saturday - 8 February 2014.

Home	Score	Away	Match Information
Home	Score	Away	Date and Time	Venue	Referee	Attendance
Hull Dockers	76 – 0	Bristol Sonics	1 February 2014	The Willows Club	G Dolan
Lock Lane	14 – 15	Normanton Knights	1 February 2014	Lock Lane Sports Centre	T Grant
Woolston Rovers	6 – 20	Elland RLFC	1 February 2014	Monk Sports Club	J Callaghan
Wath Brow Hornets	18 – 0	Halton Simms Cross	1 February 2014	Trumpet Road	J Smith
York Acorn	12 – 16	Siddal	1 February 2014	Acorn Sports & Social Club	S Race
Pilkington Recs	46 – 4	Aberdeen Warriors	1 February 2014	Ruskin Park	L Moore
Widnes St Maries	16 – 42	Wigan St Patricks	1 February 2014	Select Security Stadium	I Scott
South West London Chargers	12 – 6	Torfaen Tigers	1 February 2014	Dukes Meadow, Chiswick RUFC	C Kay
Myton Warriors	24 – 22	East Hull	1 February 2014	Marist Sporting Club	B Robinson
Royal Navy	4 – 24	Walney Central	1 February 2014	United Services Sports Ground	A Fazackerley
Askam RLFC	8 – 12	British Army	1 February 2014	Fallowfield Park	C Campbell
Royal Air Force	38 – 10	Dewsbury Celtic	1 February 2014	RAF Cranwell	A Tolley
Skirlaugh Bulls	10 – 16	Rochdale Mayfield	1 February 2014	Eastside Community Sports Club	C Straw
Kells	24 – 16	Wigan St Judes	1 February 2014	Old Arrowthwaite	A Bentham
Leigh Miners Rangers	12 – 10	Hunslet Warriors	1 February 2014	Leigh Miners Welfare Sports Club	S Mikalauskas
Blackbrook Royals	4 – 10	Egremont Rangers	1 February 2014	Blackbrook Sports & Recreation Club	T Hudson
Leeds Metropolitan University	44 – 16	Millom RLFC	1 February 2014	Beckett Park	R Thompson
Underbank Rangers	30 – 34	East Leeds	1 February 2014	The Cross Grounds	M Mannifield
Loughborough University	24 – 38	British Police	2 February 2014	Epinal Way	R Webb
Saddleworth Rangers	18 – 28	Milford Marlins	8 February 2014	Shaw Hall Bank Road	J McMullen
Oulton Raiders	16 – 22	West Hull	8 February 2014	Oulton Community Sports Club	G Evans
Shaw Cross Sharks	13 – 16	Thatto Heath Crusaders	8 February 2014	Shaw Cross Club	J Roberts

== Second round ==
The draw for the second round took place on 6 February 2014 and was drawn by former Wigan Warriors player Kris Radlinski and the owner of Salford Red Devils, Marwan Koukash.

Home	Score	Away	Match Information
Home	Score	Away	Date and Time	Venue	Referee	Attendance
East Leeds	28 – 16	Leeds Metropolitan University	22 February 2014, 14:00	Richmond Hill	S Mikalauskas
Hull Dockers	42 – 8	Siddal	22 February 2014, 14:00	The Willows Club	T Grant
Normanton Knights	44 – 10	Royal Air Force	22 February 2014, 14:00	Queen Elizabeth Drive	C Campbell
Pilkington Recs	38 – 0	Myton Warriors	22 February 2014, 14:00	Ruskin Park	T Hudson
South West London Chargers	6 – 24	Milford Marlins	22 February 2014, 14:00	Dukes Meadow, Chiswick RUFC	A Bentham
Walney Central	16 – 28	Egremont Rangers	22 February 2014, 14:00	The Old Police House, Central Drive	J Roberts
Wath Brow Hornets	12 – 6	Elland RLFC	22 February 2014, 14:00	Trumpet Road	J Callaghan
West Hull	28 – 18	Thatto Heath Crusaders	22 February 2014, 14:00	West Hull Community Park	I Scott
Kells	26 – 12	Leigh Miners Rangers	22 February 2014, 14:30	Old Arrowthwaite	L Moore
Rochdale Mayfield	28 – 36	Wigan St Patricks	22 February 2014, 14:30	Mayfield Sports Centre	C Straw
British Police	30 – 34	British Army	23 February 2014, 14:00	Arthur Miller Stadium, Stanningley ARLFC	S Race

== Third round ==
The draw for the third round took place on 24 February 2014 and was made at the University of Gloucestershire's Park Campus in Cheltenham by the university's pro vice-chancellor Maxine Melling and Kevan Blackadder, the editor of the Gloucestershire Echo.

The third-round fixtures were drawn from two pools. Pool A comprised the 14 Championship teams plus four Championship 1 teams drawn at random. From this pool two teams were drawn and awarded a bye into the fourth round, the two teams drawn were Featherstone Rovers and London Skolars. The need to award byes came from the decision by the French teams invited into the competition to withdraw at a late stage.

The remaining five Championship 1 sides and the 11 winners of second-round matches formed Pool B. All the third round fixtures comprised a team from Pool A vs a team from Pool B. The team with home advantage was also determined randomly for each fixture.

Home	Score	Away	Match Information
Home	Score	Away	Date and Time	Venue	Referee	Attendance
Leigh Centurions	74 – 6	Wigan St Patricks	14 March 2014, 19:30	Leigh Sports Village	M Woodhead	994
Batley Bulldogs	52 – 4	Kells	15 March 2014, 14:00	LoveRugbyLeague.com Stadium	J Bloem	365
Normanton Knights	12 – 38	Workington Town	15 March 2014, 14:00	The Big Fellas Stadium	P Brooke	713
Keighley Cougars	42 – 0	Wath Brow Hornets	15 March 2014, 15:00	Cougar Park	D Sharpe	488
Egremont Rangers	24 – 42	Oldham	15 March 2014, 15:00	Copeland Stadium	A Sweet	340
Milford Marlins	10 – 18	Barrow Raiders	16 March 2014, 14:00	Headingley Carnegie Stadium	C Campbell	1,000
Sheffield Eagles	54 – 0	East Leeds	16 March 2014, 14:00	Owlerton Stadium	D Merrick	619
Hull Dockers	6 – 70	Halifax	16 March 2014, 14:00	KC Lightstream Stadium	T Grant	600
North Wales Crusaders	58 – 18	Pilkington Recs	16 March 2014, 14:00	Glyndŵr University Racecourse Ground	J Callaghan	544
Rochdale Hornets	76 – 4	Gloucestershire All Golds	16 March 2014, 15:00	Spotland Stadium	J Cobb	307
Dewsbury Rams	76 – 10	West Hull	16 March 2014, 15:00	Tetley's Stadium	A Gill	433
British Army	12 – 62	Doncaster	16 March 2014, 15:00	Aldershot Military Stadium	C Kendall	357
South Wales Scorpions	12 – 38	Hemel Stags	16 March 2014, 15:00	Llynfi Road, Maesteg	W Turley	213
York City Knights	34 – 32	Whitehaven	16 March 2014, 15:00	Huntington Stadium	T Crashley	403
Swinton Lions	66 – 6	Gateshead Thunder	16 March 2014, 15:00	Leigh Sports Village	G Hewer	249
Hunslet Hawks	68 – 6	Oxford Rugby League	16 March 2014, 15:00	South Leeds Stadium	M Thomason	278

== Fourth round ==
The draw for the fourth round took take place at 3:45 pm on 18 March 2014 from Quay House, MediaCityUK, and was broadcast live on BBC Radio 5 Live Sports Extra, BBC Radio Manchester, BBC Radio Leeds and BBC Radio Humberside. The fourth round saw the entry of the 14 First Utility Super League clubs, including holders Wigan Warriors, who joined the 16 winners of the third-round ties along with Featherstone Rovers and London Skolars, who received byes in the third round.

The home teams were drawn by the Mayor of Wigan, Councillor Billy Rotherham; the away teams by David Barker, representing sponsors Tetley's.

The fourth round of the Tetley's Challenge Cup was played over April 3–6.

Home	Score	Away	Match Information
Home	Score	Away	Date and Time	Venue	Referee	Attendance
Hull F.C.	36 – 37	Salford Red Devils	3 April 2014, 20:00	KC Stadium	B Thaler	5,963
Dewsbury Rams	6 – 58	Wigan Warriors	4 April 2014, 20:00	Tetley's Stadium	J Cobb	3,054
Catalans Dragons	40 – 24	London Broncos	4 April 2014, 20:00	Stade Gilbert Brutus	R Hicks	3,834
Sheffield Eagles	70 – 28	London Skolars	5 April 2014, 14:00	Owlerton Stadium	P Brooke	505
Wakefield Trinity Wildcats	6 – 60	Leeds Rhinos	6 April 2014, 14:00	Rapid Solicitors Stadium	J Child	4,482
Rochdale Hornets	22 – 28	Leigh Centurions	6 April 2014, 14:00	Spotland Stadium	D Sharpe	1,007
Batley Bulldogs	10 – 48	Castleford Tigers	6 April 2014, 14:00	LoveRugbyLeague.comStadium	G Stokes	2,482
Doncaster	68 – 18	Hemel Stags	6 April 2014, 14:00	Keepmoat Stadium	C Kendall	348
Keighley Cougars	54 – 28	Barrow Raiders	6 April 2014, 14:00	Cougar Park	D Merrick	823
Featherstone Rovers	66 – 0	North Wales Crusaders	6 April 2014, 14:00	The Big Fellas Stadium	G Hewer	1,312
Hull Kingston Rovers	24 – 28	Warrington Wolves	6 April 2014, 14:00	KC Lightstream Stadium	R Silverwood	4,911
Bradford Bulls	60 – 6	Oldham	6 April 2014, 14:00	Provident Stadium	C Leatherbarrow	2,788
Hunslet Hawks	27 – 10	Workington Town	6 April 2014, 14:00	South Leeds Stadium	W Turley	504
Halifax	10 – 34	Widnes Vikings	6 April 2014, 14:00	The Shay	M Thomason	2,271
Swinton Lions	31 – 28	York City Knights	6 April 2014, 14:00	Leigh Sports Village	J Bloem	427
Huddersfield Giants	16 – 17	St. Helens	6 April 2014, 14:15	John Smith's Stadium	P Bentham	7,150

== Fifth round ==
The fifth round draw took place live on BBC TV after the end of the 4th round match between Huddersfield Giants and St Helens. Home teams were drawn by Alex Murphy and away teams by Garry Schofield. Fixtures were played over the weekend of 26–27 April 2014. BBC TV broadcast the game between Leeds Rhinos and St Helens on Saturday 26 April.

Home	Score	Away	Match Information
Home	Score	Away	Date and Time	Venue	Referee	Attendance
Leeds Rhinos	32 – 12	St. Helens	26 April 2014, 14:30	Headingley Carnegie Stadium	R Silverwood	12,194
Swinton Lions	20 – 33	Keighley Cougars	26 April 2014, 15:00	Leigh Sports Village	T Roby	465
Wigan Warriors	52 – 8	Hunslet Hawks	27 April 2014, 15:00	DW Stadium	G Stokes	4,390
Leigh Centurions	26 – 16	Featherstone Rovers	27 April 2014, 15:00	Leigh Sports Village	B Thaler	3,664
Bradford Bulls	33 – 20	Catalans Dragons	27 April 2014, 15:00	Provident Stadium	J Child	2,341
Salford Red Devils	20 – 30	Widnes Vikings	27 April 2014, 15:00	AJ Bell Stadium	P Bentham	2,630
Warrington Wolves	68 – 0	Doncaster	27 April 2014, 15:00	Halliwell Jones Stadium	M Thomason	3,002
Castleford Tigers	60 – 16	Sheffield Eagles	27 April 2014, 15:30	The Mend A Hose Jungle	R Hicks	4,648

== Quarter-finals ==
The draw for the quarter-finals was held on Monday 28 April 2014 at 18:30 and televised on the BBC News channel. The home teams were drawn by Jason Robinson and the away teams by Paul Sculthorpe. Ties were played between June 5–8, 2014.

Home	Score	Away	Match Information
Home	Score	Away	Date and Time	Venue	Referee	Attendance
Widnes Vikings	56 – 6	Keighley Cougars	5 June 2014, 20:00	Select Security Stadium	J Child	5,252
Leeds Rhinos	25 – 12	Leigh Centurions	6 June 2014, 20:00	Headingley Carnegie Stadium	B Thaler	7,145
Wigan Warriors	4 – 16	Castleford Tigers	7 June 2014, 14:30	DW Stadium	R Silverwood	8,736
Bradford Bulls	10 – 46	Warrington Wolves	8 June 2014, 15:30	Provident Stadium	P Bentham	5,046

== Semi-finals ==
The draw for the semi-finals was held on Sunday 8 June 2014 following the Bradford/Warrington game, which was televised on BBC Two. The draw was conducted by Eorl Crabtree and Brian Noble. The ties were played on the weekend of 9–10 August 2014.

9 August 2014
14:30

Leeds Rhinos	24 – 16	Warrington Wolves

Langtree Park
Attendance: 12,132
Referee: Phil Bentham

10 August 2014
15:00

Widnes Vikings	6 – 28	Castleford Tigers

Leigh Sports Village
Attendance: 12,005
Referee: Richard Silverwood

== Final ==
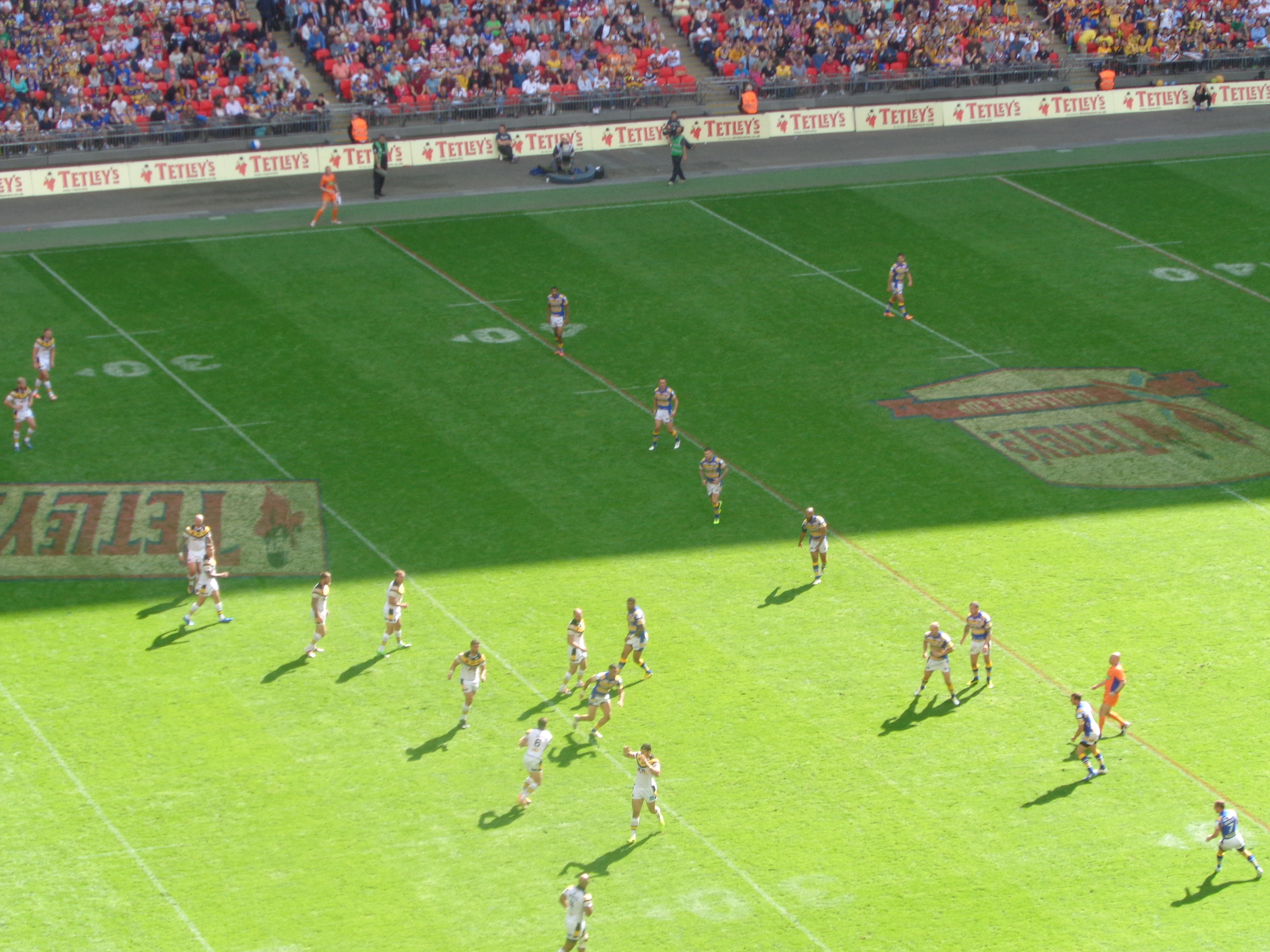
Leeds and Castleford battle it out in the final.

The final of the 2014 Challenge Cup took place on 23 August 2014 at Wembley Stadium with the match kicking off at 15:00 BST. The match was shown live on BBC One. Leeds Rhinos won the game 23–10.

23 August
15:00 BST

Castleford Tigers	10 – 23	Leeds Rhinos
Tries; Clark 1 Holmes 1 Goals; Finn 1		Tries; 2 Hall; 1 Briscoe; 1 McGuire; Goals; 3 Sinfield; Field Goal; 1 McGuire

Wembley Stadium, London
Attendance: 77,914
Referee: Phil Bentham
Player of the Match: Hall (Leeds Rhinos)

=== Teams ===
Castleford Tigers: Luke Dorn; Kirk Dixon, Jake Webster, Michael Shenton, Justin Carney; Marc Sneyd, Liam Finn; Andy Lynch, Daryl Clark, Craig Huby, Oliver Holmes, Weller Hauraki, Nathan Massey. Substitutes: Frankie Mariano, Scott Wheeldon, Jamie Ellis, Lee Jewitt.

Leeds Rhinos: Zak Hardaker; Tom Briscoe, Kallum Watkins, Joel Moon, Ryan Hall; Kevin Sinfield, Danny McGuire; Kylie Leuluai, Rob Burrow, Jamie Peacock, Brett Delaney, Carl Ablett, Jamie Jones-Buchanan. Substitutes: Paul Aiton, Ryan Bailey, Ian Kirke, Liam Sutcliffe.

== UK Broadcasting rights ==
The tournament was jointly televised by the BBC and Sky Sports on the third of their five-year contracts. The BBC screened, live, one match from each of the fourth and fifth rounds, two from the quarter-finals, both semi-finals and the final. Sky screened the two quarter-final games not being shown by the BBC.

Round	Live match	Date	BBC channel
Fourth round	Huddersfield Giants 16-17 St. Helens	April 6, 2014	BBC Two
Fifth round	Leeds Rhinos 32 - 12 St. Helens	April 26, 2014	BBC One
Quarter finals	Wigan Warriors 4 - 16 Castleford Tigers; Bradford Bulls 10 - 46 Warrington Wolves	June 7, 2014; June 8, 2014	BBC One; BBC Two
Semi finals	Leeds Rhinos 24 - 16 Warrington Wolves; Widnes Vikings 6 - 22 Castleford Tigers	August 9, 2014; August 10, 2014	BBC One; BBC Two
Final	Castleford Tigers 10 - 23 Leeds Rhinos	August 23	BBC One

Sky Sports televised the other two quarter final matches live. The first was Widnes Vikings and Keighley Cougars and the second was Leeds Rhinos and Leigh Centurions
