= History of the National Conference League =

The National Conference League is the top league in the pyramid of amateur rugby leagues. It was formerly run by the British Amateur Rugby League Association (BARLA) in winter but now forms tier 3 of the RFL's pyramid in summer.

== Background ==
While in the early days rugby league had an established structure outside of the professional leagues with county-wide competitions and the like, this soon decayed into local district leagues usually only featuring teams from one or two towns with no input from the professional game. This eventually saw the number of amateur rugby league clubs reduce to a mere 150 in the early 1970s.

Against this background British Amateur Rugby League Association were formed in 1973. One of their first acts was to merge the vast majority of the district leagues into three regional leagues: the Yorkshire League, the Pennine League and the North Western Counties League. For geographical reasons the Hull League, the Cumberland League, the Barrow League and the London League were left as they were.

This allowed clubs to play at more appropriate standards as there were more divisions, and this factor along with the improved governance of BARLA saw the standard and numbers of clubs rise quickly. However, while there was a National Cup, the best amateur clubs were still divided between six leagues and thus the desire for an amateur National League arose.

== One division era ==
Against this background the BARLA National League was formed. The inaugural season was held in 1986–1987. The league received twenty-seven applications including five from the Barrow area alone, and more unusually, one from a London club- South London Warriors.

In the end the league settled on ten members, all from the northern strongholds of the game. These were four clubs from Yorkshire: Dudley Hill, Milford Marlins, Heworth and West Hull; four clubs from Lancashire: Pilkington Recs, Wigan St Patrick's, Woolston Rovers and Leigh Miners' Welfare; and two clubs from Cumbria: Egremont Rangers and Millom. These ten clubs were to be the members for each of the first three seasons.

=== 1986/87 ===
Champions: Heworth

=== 1987/88 ===
Champions: Milford Marlins

=== 1988/89 ===
Champions: West Hull

== Two division era ==
The National League soon proved popular and for the 1989/90 season extended the top flight to twelve teams to include Lock Lane and Mayfield. However, this modest expansion wasn't enough and the 1989/90 season also saw the addition of a 10-team second division (to expand to 12 teams after one season).

The ten inaugural members of the second division were as follows: Saddleworth Rangers, Leigh East, British Aerospace, Barrow Island, Askam, Knottingley, Redhill, Dewsbury Celtic, Shaw Cross Sharks and East Leeds. This expansion was to prove successful with Leigh East becoming the first non-founder members to win the league in the 1990/91 season.

=== 1989/90 ===
- Division 1
- Champions: Dudley Hill
- Relegated: Milford Marlins and Lock Lane
- Division 2
- Champions:Saddleworth Rangers
- Also promoted: Leigh East
- Elected to league for next season: Greetland Allrounders and Beverley

=== 1990/91 ===
- Division 1
- Champions: Leigh East
- Relegated: West Hull
- Resign from league: Pilkington Recs
- Division 2
- Champions: Barrow Island
- Also promoted: Askam
- Resign from league: Knottingley and British Aerospace
- Elected to league for next season: Moldgreen, Walney Central and Oulton Raiders

=== 1991/92 ===
- Division 1
- Champions: Wigan St Patrick's
- Relegated: Barrow Island and Mayfield
- Division 2
- Champions: West Hull
- Also promoted: Dewsbury Celtic

=== 1992/93 ===
- Division 1
- Champions: Saddleworth Rangers
- Division 2
- Champions: Mayfield

== Three division era ==
In 1993 the RFL wanted to contract the professional ranks from 35 to 32 teams. However, their initial plan to place the excluded teams in the Alliance (reserve grade) faced a legal challenge so they needed an alternative competition to place them in. The RFL thus proposed a league to bridge the gap between the professional and amateur leagues to feature the three demoted semi-pro clubs plus Hemel Hempstead (who already played in the Alliance as a semi-pro club) and eight BARLA clubs.

However, BARLA wanted all National League clubs to be in any such league and since the RFL were in a tough legal position they were prepared to compromise with BARLA and thus the three division National Conference League was born. Other concessions made were an increase in the BARLA representation in the Challenge Cup from a mere 2 clubs to 64 and allowing the National Conference League champions to apply to replace the bottom team in the pro leagues.

However, the latter concession soon disappeared as the pro leagues moved to summer and the National Conference League did not want to move, furthermore Woolston Rovers' application to replace Highfield was voted out (the one club elected to the league from the National Conference League being Chorley Borough who were themselves a former semi-pro league club). The National Conference League soon expanded all divisions to 14 teams, though on occasions it has struggled to reach full complement of members, and lost all the remaining semi-pro clubs within three seasons.

Due to the switch of the pro game to summer the National Conference League gradually came to be seen as solely a BARLA league, despite being temporarily expelled from BARLA in 2002 , with only three National Conference League teams joining National League Three which was intended as a league to bridge the gap between the pro and amateur games. However, this was to change in 2008 when the National Conference League decided they did not like the path BARLA was taking and downgraded the league's BARLA membership from full to associate. In 2009 the National Conference League introduced a summer competition for clubs wanting to play year round as a test for a more permanent switch to summer which was to come in 2012.

=== Founder members of the National Conference League ===
- Premier Division
- From pro leagues: Chorley Borough, Blackpool Gladiators and Nottingham City
- From Rugby League Alliance: Hemel Hempstead Stags
- From National League Division 1: Dudley Hill, West Hull, Leigh Miners Welfare, Wigan St Patrick's, Woolston Rovers, Egremont Rangers, Saddleworth Rangers and Askam
- Division 1
- From National League Division 1: Dewsbury Celtic, Heworth, Millom and Leigh East
- From National League Division 2: Lock Lane, Mayfield, Beverley, East Leeds, Walney Central and Oulton Raiders
- Division 2
- From National League Division 2: Barrow Island, Shaw Cross Sharks, Greetland Allrounders, Redhill, Moldgreen and Milford Marlins
- Elected from Regional leagues: Oldham St Anne's, Blackbrook Royals, Eastmoor Dragons and York Acorn

=== 1993/94 ===
- Premier Division
- Champions: Woolston Rovers
- Relegated: Blackpool Gladiators and Nottingham City
- Division 1
- Champions: Heworth
- Also promoted: Mayfield
- Relegated: none
- Division 2
- Champions: Oldham St Anne's
- Also promoted: Moldgreen
- Elected to league for next season: New Earswick All Blacks, Thornhill Trojans, Eccles & Salford Juniors and Northampton Knights

=== 1994/95 ===
- Premier Division
- Champions: Woolston Rovers
- Elected to pro leagues: Chorley Borough
- Relegated: Askam
- Division 1
- Champions: Millom
- Also promoted: Lock Lane
- Leave to join RL Alliance: Blackpool Gladiators
- Folded: Nottingham City
- Relegated: None
- Division 2
- Champions: Eastmoor Dragons
- Also promoted: Thornhill Trojans and Blackbrook Royals
- Expelled mid-season: Greetland Allrounders
- Elected to league for next season: Hull Dockers, Wigan St Jude's, Ovenden and Normanton Knights

=== 1995/96 ===
- Premier Division
- Champions: Woolston Rovers
- Leave to join RL Alliance: Hemel Hempstead Stags
- Relegated: Millom
- Division 1
- Champions: Beverley
- Also promoted: Oldham St Anne's
- Resign from league: Dewsbury Celtic
- Relegated: none
- Division 2:
- Champions: Wigan St Jude's
- Also promoted: Barrow Island
- Expelled and folded mid-season: Northampton Knights
- Elected to league for next season: Dewsbury Moor, Skirlaugh and Featherstone Amateurs

=== 1996/97 ===
- Premier Division
- Champions:West Hull
- Relegated: none
- Division 1
- Champions: Askam
- Also promoted: Walney Central
- Relegated: Millom
- Division 2
- Champions: Redhill
- Also promoted: Milford Marlins, Skirlaugh and Shaw Cross Sharks
- Elected to league for next season: Crosfields, Dodworth, London Skolars and Siddal

=== 1997/98 ===
- Premier Division
- Champions: Egremont Rangers
- Relegated: Mayfield and Castleford Lock Lane
- Division 1
- Champions: Skirlaugh
- Also promoted: Thornhill Trojans
- Resign from league: Moldgreen
- Relegated: Blackbrook Royals
- Division 2
- Champions: Featherstone Lions
- Also promoted: Siddal and Millom
- Elected to league for next season: Ideal Isberg and Keighley Albion

=== 1998/99 ===
- Premier Division
- Champions: West Hull
- Resign from league: Egremont Rangers and Beverley
- Relegated: Heworth
- Division 1
- Champions: Redhill
- Also promoted: Castleford Lock Lane
- Relegated: Milford and Eastmoor Dragons
- Division 2
- Champions: Ideal Isberg
- Also promoted: Eccles & Salford Juniors and Blackbrook Royals
- Expelled from league: Ovenden (mid-season) and Dodworth
- Elected to league for next season: Sheffield Hillsborough Hawks, Castleford Panthers, Waterhead and West Bowling

=== 1999/2000 ===
- Premier Division
- Champions: West Hull
- Relegated: Askam
- Division 1
- Champions: Oulton Raiders
- Also promoted: Ideal Isberg
- Resigned from league: Barrow Island
- Relegated: Blackbrook Royals
- Division 2
- Champions: Eastmoor Dragons
- Also promoted: Waterhead and West Bowling
- Elected to league for next season: Thatto Heath Crusaders and Cottingham Tigers

=== 2000/01 ===
- Premier Division
- Champions: West Hull
- Relegated: Dudley Hill and Redhill
- Division 1
- Champions: Leigh East
- Also promoted: Siddal
- Relegated: Heworth and Millom
- Division 2
- Champions: Thatto Heath Crusaders
- Also promoted: Hull Dockers
- Expelled from league: Blackbrook Royals
- Resigned from league: London Skolars
- Not re-elected: New Earswick All Blacks
- Elected to league for next season: Hunslet Warriors

=== 2001/02 ===
- Premier Division
- Champions: West Hull
- Relegated: Walney Central and Saddleworth Rangers
- Division 1
- Champions: West Bowling
- Also promoted: East Leeds
- Relegated: Rochdale Mayfield and Eastmoor Dragons
- Division 2
- Champions: Crosfield
- Also promoted: Hunslet Warriors
- Resigned from league: Keighley Albion and Dewsbury Moor
- Elected to league for next season: Wath Brow Hornets, Huddersfield Sharks and Widnes St Mary's

=== 2002/03 ===
- Premier Division
- Champions: Siddal
- Resigned to join National League 3: Woolston Rovers
- Relegated: East Leeds
- Division 1
- Champions: Thatto Heath Crusaders
- Also promoted: Featherstone Lions
- Expelled mid-season: Redhill
- Relegated: Waterhead
- Division 2
- Champions: Wath Brow Hornets
- Also promoted: Milford Marlins
- Resigned to join National League 3: Sheffield Hillsborough Hawks
- Elected to league for next season: East Hull and Ince Rose Bridge

=== 2003/04 ===
- Premier Division
- Champions: Siddal
- Relegated: Castleford Lock Lane, Ideal Isberg and Featherstone Lions
- Division 1
- Champions: Wath Brow Hornets
- Also promoted: Wigan St Jude's and Hull Dockers
- Resigned from league to focus on National League 3: Dudley Hill
- Relegated: Saddleworth Rangers and Crosfields
- Division 2
- Champions: East Hull
- Also promoted: Castleford Panthers and Rochdale Mayfield

Elected to league for next season: Ovenden and Stanningley

=== 2004/05 ===
- Premier Division
- Champions: Leigh Miners Rangers
- Relegated: West Hull, West Bowling and Thatto Heath Crusaders
- Division 1
- Champions: Shaw Cross Sharks
- Also promoted: East Hull and Eccles & Salford Juniors
- Relegated: Castleford Panthers and Featherstone Lions
- Division 2
- Champions: Ince Rose Bridge
- Also promoted: Eastmoor Dragons and York Acorn
- Resigned from league: Cottingham Tigers
- Elected to league for next season: Egremont Rangers

=== 2005/06 ===
- Premier Division
- Champions: Oulton Raiders
- Relegated: Eccles & Salford Juniors, Leigh East and Wigan St Jude's
- Division 1
- Champions: West Hull
- Also promoted: West Bowling and Eastmoor Dragons
- Expelled from league: Hunslet Warriors
- Resigned from league: Walney Central
- Relegated: Askam and Ideal Isberg
- Division 2
- Champions: Castleford Panthers
- Also promoted: Ovenden and Widnes St Mary's
- Resigned from league: Featherstone Lions (mid-season) and Huddersfield Sharks
- Elected to league: Bradford Dudley Hill and Brighouse Rangers

=== 2006/07 ===
- Premier Division
- Champions: Skirlaugh
- Relegated: Oldham St Annes, Wath Brow Hornets and Shaw Cross Sharks
- Division 1
- Champions: Rochdale Mayfield
- Also promoted: Leigh East and Castleford Panthers
- Relegated: Castleford Lock Lane, Milford Marlins and Ovenden
- Division 2
- Champions: Waterhead
- Also promoted: Bradford Dudley Hill and Saddleworth Rangers
- Elected to league for next season: Stanley Rangers

=== 2007/08 ===
- Premier Division
- Champions: East Hull
- Relegated: Castleford Panthers, West Bowling and Eastmoor Dragons
- Division 1
- Champions: Wigan St Jude's
- Also promoted: York Acorn and Thatto Heath Crusaders
- Relegated: Eccles & Salford Juniors, Waterhead and East Leeds
- Division 2
- Champions: Millom
- Also promoted: Stanningley and Normanton Knights
- Expelled from league mid-season: Brighouse Rangers
- Resigned from league: Askam
- Elected to league for next season: Myton Warriors

=== 2008/09 ===
- Premier Division
- Champions: Siddal
- Relegated: Thatto Heath Crusaders, Rochdale Mayfield and Thornhill Trojans
- Division 1
- Champions: Wath Brow Hornets
- Also promoted: Ince Rose Bridge and Widnes St Mary's
- Relegated: Eastmoor Dragons, Shaw Cross Sharks and Oldham St Anne's
- Division 2
- Champions: Myton Warriors
- Also promoted: Milford Marlins and Heworth
- Resigned from league: Hull Isberg

=== 2009/10 ===
- Premier Division
- Champions: Leigh East
- Relegated: Oulton Raiders, Ince Rose Bridge and Widnes St Mary's
- Division 1
- Champions: Thatto Heath Crusaders
- Also promoted: Bradford Dudley Hill and Saddleworth Rangers
- Relegated: West Bowling and Heworth
- Resigned from league: Thornhill Trojans
- Division 2
- Champions: Eccles & Salford Juniors
- Also promoted: Oldham St Anne's and Stanley Rangers
- Elected to league: Hunslet Warriors and Elland

=== 2010/2011 ===
- Premier Division
- Champions: Thatto Heath Crusaders
- Relegated: Bradford Dudley Hill, Wigan St Jude's and York Acorn
- Division 1
- Champions: Oulton Raiders
- Also promoted: Myton Warriors and Ince Rose Bridge
- Relegated: Normanton Knights
- Resigned midseason: Widnes St Maries
- Division 2
- Champions: Hunslet Warriors
- Also promoted: Egremont Rangers and Castleford Lock Lane
- Resigned from league: West Bowling
- Elected to league for transitional season: Askam and Widnes West Bank
- Elected to league for summer 2012 season: Featherstone Lions and Dewsbury Celtic

=== 2011 Transitional Season ===
To allow clubs to switch to the summer season more easily a short season was carried out from August to November 2011 with the following group format:

- Group A: Egremont Rangers, Leigh East, Leigh Miners Rangers, Thatto Heath Crusaders, Wath Brow Hornets
- Group B: Askam, Ince Rose Bridge, Millom, Wigan St Jude's, Wigan St Patrick's
- Group C: Elland, Ovenden, Rochdale Mayfield, Saddleworth Rangers, Siddal
- Group D: East Leeds, Hunslet Warriors, Milford Marlins, Oulton Raiders, Stanningley
- Group E: Crosfield, Eccles & Salford, Oldham St Anne's, Waterhead, Widnes West Bank
- Group F: Castleford Lock Lane, Catleford Panthers, Eastmoor Dragons, Normanton Knights, Stanley Rangers
- Group G: Bradford Dudley Hill, Heworth, Shaw Cross Sharks, York Acorn (West Bowling withdrew)
- Group H: East Hull, Hull Dockers, Myton Warriors, Skirlaugh, West Hull

Clubs played 12 league games (home and away in their pool and two other clubs home and away), then there were playoffs. There was also a reserve team league.

== Four division era ==
From 2012 the Conference played in summer, as tier 3 of the new pyramid, and the initial season saw two former Rugby League Conference National Division clubs admitted (Dewsbury Celtic and Featherstone Lions) with others expected to join from 2013. For one season only the Rugby League Conference National Division ran as Conference division three with no automatic promotion to division two, but after this, all northern clubs were required to meet full Conference criteria to play in tier 3. The RFL also had ambitions of a Conference South which would leave the former National Conference League as Conference North. From 2013, the limit on member clubs was raised from 42 to 56 and saw an increase to four divisions.

=== Admitted to division 3 for 2012 ===
- Bramley Buffaloes, Bristol Sonics, Coventry Bears, Hemel Stags, Huddersfield Underbank Rangers, Kippax Knights, Nottingham Outlaws, St Albans Centurions and Valley Cougars. Valley Cougars withdrew and were replaced by South Wales Hornets

=== 2012 ===
- Premier Division
- Champions: Wath Brow Hornets
- Relegated: Oulton Raiders and Saddleworth Rangers
- Demoted to division 2 (for non-fulfilment of fixture): Leigh East
- Division 1
- Champions: Egremont Rangers
- Also promoted: Castleford Lock Lane and York Acorn
- Relegated: Stanningley, Oldham St Anne's and Castleford Panthers
- Division 2
- Champions: East Leeds
- Also promoted: Waterhead and Dewsbury Celtic
- Demoted to division 3 (for non-fulfilment of fixture): Crosfields, Featherstone Lions and Heworth
- Division 3
- Champions (elected to Championship 1): Hemel Stags
- Remain in division 3 for 2013: Huddersfield Underbank Rangers and Coventry Bears
- Demoted to Conference League South: Nottingham Outlaws, Bristol Sonics and St Albans Centurions
- Demoted to Yorkshire Men's League: Bramley Buffaloes and Kippax Knights
- Folded: Warrington Wizards (joined Woolston Rovers) and South Wales Hornets
- Accepted into division 3 for 2013: Kells, Pilkington Recs, Hindley, Wigan St Cuthbert's, Peterlee Pumas, Blackbrook and Woolston Rovers.

=== 2013 ===
- Premier Division
- Champions: Thatto Heath Crusaders
- Relegated: Ince Rose Bridge, Myton Warriors and York Acorn
- Division 1
- Champions: East Leeds
- Also promoted: Hunslet Warriors and Wigan St Judes
- Demoted to Division 2: Bradford Dudley Hill
- Relegated: Stanley Rangers and Waterhead
- Division 2
- Champions: Normanton Knights
- Also promoted: Shaw Cross Sharks
- Relegated: Eastmoor Dragons
- Pulled out mid-season: Widnes West Bank
- Division 3
- Champions: Kells
- Also promoted: Pilkington Recs

=== 2014 ===
- Premier Division
- Champions: West Hull
- Relegated: Skirlaugh, Hunslet Warriors and Wigan St Judes
- Resigned midseason: East Hull
- Division 1
- Champions: Oulton Raiders
- Also promoted: Rochdale Mayfield
- Relegated: Dewsbury Celtic and Millom
- NB: Eccles merged with non-league Irlam Hornets to form Salford City Roosters for the 2015 season
- Division 2
- Champions: Kells
- Also promoted: Elland and Pilkington Recs
- Relegated: Waterhead and Stanningley
- Resigned after season: Ovenden
- Division 3
- Champions: Featherstone Lions
- Also promoted: Blackbrook and Underbank Rangers
- Elected to League 1: Coventry Bears
- Resigned midseason: Wigan St Cuthberts
- Resigned after season: Hindley; Peterlee Pumas
- Elected to league for next season: Dewsbury Moor, Drighlington, Gateshead Storm, Hunslet Club Parkside, Thornhill Trojans and Wibsey Warriors

=== 2015 ===
- Premier Division
- Champions: Leigh Miners Rangers
- Relegated: East Leeds, Oulton Raiders and Thatto Heath Crusaders
- Division 1
- Champions: Kells
- Also promoted: Pilkington Recs and York Acorn
- Relegated: Saddleworth Rangers, Salford City Roosters and Wigan St Judes
- Division 2
- Champions: Millom
- Also promoted: Featherstone Lions and Underbank Rangers
- Relegated: Oldham St Annes
- Resigned midseason: Castleford Panthers
- Division 3
- Champions: Hunslet Club Parkside
- Also promoted: Stanningley and Thornhill Trojans
- Resigned midseason: Heworth
- Resigned after season: Wibsey Warriors
- Elected to league for next season: Castleford Panthers and Rylands Sharks

=== 2016 ===
- Premier Division
- Champions: Siddal
- Relegated: Hull Dockers, Lock Lane and York Acorn
- Division 1
- Champions: Thatto Heath Crusaders
- Also promoted: Myton Warriors and Skirlaugh
- Relegated: East Leeds, Millom and Oulton Raiders
- Demoted to division 3: Elland
- Division 2
- Champions: Hunslet Club Parkside
- Also promoted: Blackbrook
- Relegated: Dewsbury Celtic, Stanley Rangers and Stanningley
- Division 3
- Champions: Crosfields
- Also promoted: Drighlington
- Resigned midseason: Castleford Panthers
- Elected to league for next season: Barrow Island, Clock Face Miners and West Bowling

=== 2017 ===
- Premier Division
- Champions: Thatto Heath Crusaders
- Relegated: Leigh Miners Rangers, Pilkington Recs and Skirlaugh
- Division 1
- Champions: Hunslet Club Parkside
- Also promoted: Normanton Knights and Underbank Rangers
- Relegated: Hull Dockers and Hunslet Warriors
- Failed to complete the season and demoted to division 3: Blackbrook
- Division 2
- Champions: Oulton Raiders
- Also promoted: Bradford Dudley Hill and Thornhill Trojans
- Relegated: Leigh East, Millom and Salford City Roosters
- Division 3
- Champions: West Bowling
- Also promoted: Dewsbury Moor Maroons and Stanningley
- Resigned midseason: Elland and Rylands Sharks
- Elected to league for next season: Beverley

=== 2018 ===
- Premier Division
- Champions: Hunslet Club Parkside
- Relegated: Normanton Knights, Wigan St Patricks and Myton Warriors
- Division 1
- Champions: Thornhill Trojans
- Also promoted: Lock Lane and Leigh Miners Rangers
- Relegated: Ince Rose Bridge, Shaw Cross Sharks and Bradford Dudley Hill
- Division 2
- Champions: Stanningley
- Also promoted: Dewsbury Moor Maroons
- Relegated: Drighlington, Hunslet Warriors and Leigh East
- Division 3
- Champions: Beverley
- Also promoted: Barrow Island and Clock Face Miners
- Resigned after season: Stanley Rangers
- Elected to league for next season: Batley Boys, Heworth, Hensingham

== Sources ==
- - former National Conference League official website
- https://www.rugby-league.com/leagues__competitions/national_conference_league - National Conference League official website
- The Times newspaper archives (results section 1986 onwards plus several articles from 1986 and 1993 about the formation of the National League and National Conference League respectively)
