= NCRL National League One =

British amateur rugby league

National League One
- Sport: Rugby league
- Founded: 2026; 0 years ago
- No. of teams: 12
- Country: England
- Most recent champion: Dewsbury Celtic (1st title)
- Promotion to: National Premier League
- Relegation to: National Conferences
- Domestic cup: Challenge Cup
- Website: Official website

The National League One is the second highest level of national amateur rugby league in Britain. It is also the second tier of the National Community Rugby League

== History ==
In November 2025, the RFL launched its National Community Rugby League initiative which proposed replacing the National Conference League (NCL) with two national leagues and a number of regional leagues. While most clubs were not in favour of the initiative, the clubs decided to agree to the proposal "for the good of the sport". The NCL clubs met on 19 January and agreed to dissolve the NCL.

National League One effectively replaced the old NCL Division 1. The previous seasons relegation were still in place with Dewsbury Moor and Leigh Miners Rangers having been relegated from the old Premier Division and NCL Division 2 winners East Leeds as well as promoted teams Dewsbury Celtic and Pilkington Recs.

== Clubs ==
National League One
Club	Founded	Location
Dewsbury Moor Maroons	1968	Dewsbury, West Yorkshire
Egremont Rangers	1900	Egremont, Cumbria
Heworth	1922	Heworth, York
Kells	1931	Whitehaven, Cumbria
Leigh Miners Rangers	1966	Leigh, Greater Manchester
Oldham St Annes	1946	Oldham, Greater Manchester
Oulton Raiders	1962	Oulton, West Yorkshire, England
Rochdale Mayfield	1958	Castleton, Greater Manchester
Pilkington Recs	1949	St Helens, Merseyside
Shaw Cross Sharks	1947	Shaw Cross, Dewsbury, West Yorkshire
Stanningley	1889	Stanningley, Leeds, West Yorkshire
Wigan St Patricks	1910	Wigan, Greater Manchester

== Results ==
Season	Winners	Runners up	Playoff Winner	Score	Playoff Runner up	Relegated
2026	Dewsbury Celtic	Kells	East Leeds	23-10	Oulton Raiders	Wigan St Patricks

== See also ==
- National Community Rugby League
