= BARLA Yorkshire Cup =

Amateur rugby league competition

The BARLA Yorkshire Cup is a knock-out rugby league competition for amateur teams in the traditional county of Yorkshire. It is administered by the British Amateur Rugby League Association (BARLA). The winners of the most recent staging of the competition in 2019 are Lock Lane.

Between 1905 and 1993, a Yorkshire County Cup was competed for by the professional sides.

== Winners ==
Final	Winner	Score	Runners-up
1973–74	West Hull	13–10	Illingworth
1974–75	Dewsbury Celtic	17–12	NDLB
1975–76	Pointer Panthers	13–6	West Hull
1976–77	Beecroft & Wightman	9–6	Dewsbury Celtic
1977–78	Dewsbury Celtic	13–7	NDLB
1978–79	Ace Amateurs	8–4	NDLB
1979–80	Ace	8–2	West Hull
1980–81	Milford	21–11	Siddal
1981–82	West Hull	33–16	Jubilee
1982–83	Lock Lane	19–13	Jubilee
1983–84	Mysons	14–4	Heworth Premier
1984–85	West Hull	14–12	Jesmond
1985–86	Dudley Hill	15–2	Mysons
1986–87	Elland	24–12	Jubilee
1987–88	West Hull	21–14	Ace
1988–89	West Hull	32–21	Hunslet Junction
1989–90	Bison	18–16	NDLB
1990–91	Cutsyke	14–10	Dudley Hill
1991–92	Hull Dockers	41–8	Dudley Hill
1992–93	Westgate Redoubt	17–14	Normanton
1993–94	Heworth	21–6	Beverley
1994–95	Skirlaugh	24–20	Heworth
1995–96	Skirlaugh	11–6	Thornhill
1996–97	Queens	13–9	Clayton
1997–98	Featherstone Lions	9–6	Siddal
1998–99	Townville	13–9	Norland
1999–00	Hunslet Warriors	34–8	Dewsbury Celtic
2000–01	Lindley Swifts	16–11	Hunslet Warriors
2001–02	Elland	17–6	Sharlston Rovers
2002–03	East Hull	18–8	Cutsyke
2003–04	Elland	23–11	Queens
2004–05	Drighlington	22–12	Elland
2005–06	Sharlston Rovers	21–18	Queensbury
2006–07	East Hull	12–11	Stanley Rangers
2007–08	Queens	24–8	Sharlston Rovers
2008–09	Sharlston Rovers	20–0	Hunslet Warriors
2009–10	Sharlston Rovers	28–12	Hunslet Old Boys
2010–11	Queens	16–6	Drighlington
2011–12	Hunslet Old Boys	20–16	Thornhill
2012–13	Sharlston Rovers	24–10	Nevison Leap
2013–14	Hunslet Old Boys	32–6	Thornhill
2014–15	Drighlington	12–0	Queens
2015–16	Fryston	50–10	North Hull Knights
2016–17	Fryston	20–14	Three Tuns
2017–18	Lock Lane	31–10	Ovenden
2018–19	Lock Lane	38–20	Upton
2019–20	Mirfield	16–12	Drighlington
2020–21	No competition due to the COVID-19 pandemic		
2021–22	Hunslet Club Parkside	32–0	Doncaster Toll Bar
2022–23	Normanton	28–26	Fryston
2023–24	Hunslet	32–18	Mirfield

== See also ==
- Rugby league county cups
- BARLA National Cup
- CMS Yorkshire league
- Pennine League
