= NCRL National Premier League =

British amateur rugby league

National Premier League
- Sport: Rugby league
- Founded: 2026; 0 years ago
- No. of teams: 12
- Country: England
- Most recent champion: Hunslet ARLFC
- Level on pyramid: 3
- Relegation to: National League One
- Domestic cups: Challenge Cup; National Cup
- Website: Official website

The National Premier League is the highest level of amateur rugby league in Britain. It is also the top tier of the National Community Rugby League

== History ==
In November 2025, the RFL launched its National Community Rugby League initiative which proposed replacing the National Conference League (NCL) with two national leagues and a number of regional leagues. While most clubs were not in favour of the initiative, the clubs decided to agree to the proposal "for the good of the sport". The member clubs met on 19 January and agreed to dissolve the NCL.

The National Premier League effectively replaced the NCL Premier Division. In December 2025, it was reported that the inaugural season would be known as the National Conference Premier with teams competing for the NCL 40th Anniversary trophy to celebrate forty years since the NCL was founded.

== Clubs ==
National Premier League
Club	Founded	Location
Dewsbury Celtic	1879	Dewsbury, West Yorkshire
East Leeds	1979	Richmond Hill, Leeds, West Yorkshire
Hunslet ARLFC	2022	Hunslet, Leeds, West Yorkshire
Castleford Lock Lane	2001	Castleford, West Yorkshire
Siddal	1908	Halifax, West Yorkshire
Thatto Heath Crusaders	1981	Thatto Heath, St Helens, Merseyside
Waterhead Warriors	1920	Oldham, Greater Manchester
Wath Brow Hornets	1898	Cleator Moor, Cumbria
West Bowling	1950	Bradford, West Yorkshire
West Hull	1961	Kingston upon Hull, East Yorkshire
Wigan St Judes	1980	Wigan, Greater Manchester
York Acorn	1973	Acomb, York, North Yorkshire

== Results ==
Season	Winner	Score	Runners-up	Relegated
2026	Hunslet ARLFC	14-0	West Hull	Heworth; Rochdale Mayfield

== See also ==
- National Community Rugby League
