= RFL Championships =

The RFL Championships was a collective name for the second and third tiers of the British rugby league system between 2009 and 2015:

- RFL Championship
- RFL League 1
