= Lancashire Cup =

Lancashire Cup may refer to several sporting competitions in Lancashire, England:

- Lancashire Senior Cup, an association football competition founded in 1879
- Lancashire FA Challenge Trophy, an association football competition 1885–1932
- RFL Lancashire Cup, a rugby league county cup 1905–1993
- Lancashire County Cup, a rugby league competition 1973–2012
- Lancashire Cup (rugby union), a men's rugby union competition 1971–2013
