= Rugby League Regional Leagues =

- Country: England
- Other club(s) from: Wales; Scotland
- Confederation: RFL; BARLA
- Divisions: Cumbria League; East League; London and South East League; Midlands League; North West League; North East League; North Wales Conference (Scotland) Scottish National League; South West League; South Premier; South Wales Conference; West League; Yorkshire League
- Level on pyramid: 5
- Promotion to: National Conference League; Conference League South
- Domestic cup: Challenge Cup

The Rugby League Regional Leagues are a group of regional leagues which are at the bottom of the British rugby league pyramid consisting of teams from England, Scotland, and Wales.
