= Harry Burton (rugby league) =

English rugby league footballer

Personal information
- Full name: Harold Burton
- Born: Castleford, West Riding of Yorkshire, England
- Died: December 2009

Playing information
- Position: Centre
Club
| Years | Team | Pld | T | G | FG | P |
|---|---|---|---|---|---|---|
| 1950–57 | Wakefield Trinity | 99 | 40 | 19 | 0 | 138 |

Harry Burton was an English professional rugby league footballer who played in the 1950s. He played at club level for Lock Lane ARLFC, and Wakefield Trinity, as a centre.

== Playing career ==
=== First Televised Try ===
Harry Burton scored the first try when rugby league was first televised live, when Wakefield Trinity played Wigan at Central Park on Saturday 12 January 1952.

=== Club career ===
Harry Burton made his début for Wakefield Trinity during September 1950.
