= Hunslet Club Parkside =

English amateur rugby league club

Club information
- Full name: Hunslet Club Parkside; Amateur Rugby League Football Club
- Nickname(s): The Old Boys
- Colours: Green and gold
- Founded: 1940s (as Hunslet Boys Club)
- Exited: 2022 (merged with Hunslet Warriors to form Hunslet ARLFC)
- Website: Club Website

Former details
- Ground(s): Hillidge Road

Hunslet Club Parkside was an English amateur rugby league club based in Hunslet, West Yorkshire. Its first team competed in the National Conference League.

== History ==
The club was founded in the 1940s as Hunslet Boys Club, playing junior rugby until 1999 when the club formed an open age team named Hunslet Old Boys.

In 2012, Hunslet Parkside approached Hunslet Old Boys about a possible merger, which went ahead several months later. Hunslet Parkside was a junior club formed in 1973 following the demise of the town's professional club, and was based in the Belle Isle area in the south of Leeds. The club produced a number of high-profile players in its history, including Garry Schofield, Jason Robinson, Sonny Nickle, James Lowes and Sam Burgess.

In 2015, the club joined the National Conference League after its application was accepted, and officially changed its name to Hunslet Club Parkside. The club rapidly rose through the divisions, winning promotion in three consecutive seasons to reach the Premier Division. In 2018, the club was unbeaten for the entire season, winning all 22 of its league games, and defeating West Hull 26–18 in the Grand Final.

In 2022 the club merged with Hunslet Warriors to form Hunslet ARLFC.

== Honours ==
=== League ===
- National Conference League Premier Division
  - Winners (2): 2018, 2022
- National Conference League Division One
  - Winners (1): 2017
- National Conference League Division Two
  - Winners (1): 2016
- National Conference League Division Three
  - Winners (1): 2015

=== Cups ===
- BARLA Yorkshire Cup
  - Winners (2): 2011–12, 2013–14
- BARLA National Cup
  - Winners (1): 2016–17
- Conference Challenge Trophy
  - Winners (1): 2017
