= National Community Rugby League =

Rugby league in the UK

- Founded: 2026
- Country: England
- Divisions: National Leagues: National Premier League; National League One; Conference Cumbria Conference North West Conference Southern Conference Yorkshire A + B; Regional Leagues: Cumbria Men's League; London and South East Men's League; Midland Men's League; North East Men's League; North West Men's League; West and South West Men's League; Yorkshire Men's League; Women's Leagues: National Championship; Northern Leagues 1–3; Midlands Championship; Southern Championship
- Level on pyramid: 3–6
- Domestic cup: Challenge Cup
- League cup: National Cup
- Website: NCRL
- Current: 2026 National Community Rugby League

The National Community Rugby League (NCRL) is part of the British rugby league system at the top end of the amateur pyramid below the professional Championship. It comes under the jurisdiction of the Rugby Football League (RFL). The NCRL consists of the National Leagues (two National divisions and five regional conferences), the Regional Leagues (sitting below the National Leagues), and the Women's National Championship and regional leagues as well as related youth and junior competitions.

== History ==
In November 2025, the RFL launched its National Community Rugby League initiative which proposed replacing the National Conference League (NCL) with two national leagues and a number of regional leagues. While most clubs were not in favour of the initiative, the clubs decided to agree to the proposal "for the good of the sport". The NCL clubs met on 19 January and agreed to dissolve the NCL. The NCL leagues became the National Leagues of the NCRL as part of a restructuring that saw a total of 23 divisions incorporated into the unified league system.

== System ==
The NCRL National Leagues comprise two national divisions; National Premier League and National League One. Beneath them are five regional conferences; National Conference Cumbria, National Conference North West, National Conference Southern, National Conference Yorkshire A and National Conference Yorkshire B.

In each division clubs play each other twice, once at their home stadium and once at their opponents. Teams receive two points for a win, one for a draw and none for a loss. Teams are ranked by competition points, points difference (points scored less points conceded), and points scored.

At the end of the season in the National Premier League, the top six teams enter the play-offs with the winner being crowned NCRL champions. The bottom three clubs are relegated to National League One.

RFL Tier	NCRL Level	League			
3	1	National Premier League; 12 clubs			
3	2	National League One; 12 clubs			
3	3	National Conference Cumbria; 10 clubs	National Conference Southern; 8 clubs	National Conference North West; 10 clubs	National Conference Yorkshire A + B 20 clubs
4	4	Regional Leagues			
