= Heworth =

Heworth may refer to:

- Heworth, York
  - Heworth A.R.L.F.C., a rugby league club
- Heworth, Tyne and Wear
