= BARLA Lancashire Cup =

Rugby league knockout competition

The BARLA Lancashire Cup was a knock-out rugby league competition for amateur teams in the historic county of Lancashire. It was administered by the British Amateur Rugby League Association (BARLA). As of 2017, the competition hasn't been held since the 2011–12 season.

Between 1905 and 1993, a Lancashire Cup was competed for by the professional sides.

== Winners ==
Final	Winner	Score	Runners-up
1973–74	Pilkington Recs	23–13	Folly Lane
1974–75	Mayfield	32–2	Woolston Rovers
1975–76	Leigh MW	20–4	Wath Brow Hornets
1976–77	Pilkington Recs	17–0	Leigh MW
1977–78	Pilkington Recs	12–0	Latchford Albion
1978–79	Leigh MW	10–2	Crosfields
1979–80	Millom	9–2	Wath Brow Hornets
1980–81	Pilkington Recs	33–3	Rose Bridge
1981–82	Leigh MW	35–9	Saddleworth
1982–83	Rose Bridge	25–5	Crosfields
1983–84	St Patricks	9–7	Mayfield
1984–85	Waterhead	18–0	Blackbrook
1985–86	Simms Cross	21–0	Blackbrook
1986–87	Blackbrook	12–5	Pilkington Recs
1987–88	Leigh MW	22–4	Farnworth ROB
1988–89	Thatto Heath	32–12	Leigh East
1989–90	Thatto Heath	12–10	Leigh MW
1990–91	Leigh East	29–13	Thatto Heath
1991–92	Langworthy	25–21	Leigh MW
1992–93	Thatto Heath	16–14	Woolston
1993–94	Woolston	10–4	Thatto Heath
1994–95	Woolston	10–2	Oldham St Annes
1995–96	Woolston	19–12	Oldham St Annes
1996–97	Thatto Heath	12–10	Woolston
1997–98	Waterhead	12–6	Wigan Rose Bridge
1998–99	Orrell St James	20–12	Parkside Golborne
1999–00	Thatto Heath	30–10	Haydock
2000–01	Portico Panthers	8–4	Haydock
2001–02	Ince Rose Bridge	36–10	Farnworth
2002–03	Widnes Albion	19–6	Bold Miners
2003–04	Halton Simms Cross	28–20	Haydock
2004–05	Bank Quay Bulls	12–10	Orrell St James
2005–06	Blackbrook	14–2	Halton Simms Cross
2006–07	Blackbrook	30–0	Wigan St Cuthberts
2007–08	Bank Quay Bulls	23–6	Ashton Bears
2008–09	Halton Simms Cross	24-16	Pilkington Recs
2009–10	Halton Simms Cross	14–12	Rylands Sharks
2010–11	Bank Quay Bulls	28–20	Widnes West Bank
2011–12	Bank Quay Bulls	29–22	Blackbrook

== See also ==
- Rugby league county cups
- BARLA National Cup
- Pennine League
