= British rugby league system =

Five-tier league structure

- Country: United Kingdom
- Sport: Rugby league
- Promotion and relegation: No

National system
- Federation: Rugby Football League
- Confederation: European Rugby League
- Top division: Super League; Women's Super League; Wheelchair Super League
- Second division: Championship; Women's Championship; Wheelchair Championship
- Cup competition: Challenge Cup; 1895 Cup

The British rugby league system is based on a four-tier structure administered by the Rugby Football League.

== Professional clubs ==
The following is a list of professional and semi-professional clubs in the British rugby league system:

Professional rugby league clubs
Colours	Club	Established	City	Stadium
	Barrow Raiders	1875	Barrow, Cumbria	Craven Park (7,600)
	Batley Bulldogs	1880	Batley, West Yorkshire	Mount Pleasant (7,500)
	Bradford Bulls	1908	Bradford, West Yorkshire	Odsal Stadium (24,500)
	Castleford Tigers	1926	Castleford, West Yorkshire	Wheldon Road (11,743)
	Catalans Dragons	2000	Perpignan, France	Stade Gilbert Brutus (13,000)
	Dewsbury Rams	1898	Dewsbury, West Yorkshire	Crown Flatt (5,100)
	Doncaster	1951	Doncaster, South Yorkshire	Keepmoat Stadium (15,231)
	Featherstone Rovers	1902	Featherstone, West Yorkshire	Post Office Road (6,750)
	Halifax Panthers	1873	Halifax, West Yorkshire	The Shay (14,000)
	Huddersfield Giants	1864	Huddersfield, West Yorkshire	Kirklees Stadium (24,500)
	Hull FC	1865	Hull, East Riding of Yorkshire	KC Stadium (25,404)
	Hull Kingston Rovers	1882	Hull, East Riding of Yorkshire	Craven Park (12,000)
	Hunslet	1973	Leeds, West Yorkshire	South Leeds Stadium (4,000)
	Keighley Cougars	1876	Keighley, West Yorkshire	Cougar Park (7,800)
	Leeds Rhinos	1864	Leeds, West Yorkshire	Headingley (20,500)
	Leigh Leopards	1878	Leigh, Greater Manchester	Leigh Sports Village (11,000)
	London Broncos	1980	Wimbledon, Greater London	Plough Lane (9,215)
	Midlands Hurricanes	1998	Birmingham, West Midlands	Alexander Stadium (18,000)
	Newcastle Thunder	2000	Newcastle upon Tyne, Tyne and Wear	Crow Trees Ground (2,000)
	North Wales Crusaders	2011	Colwyn Bay, Wales	Eirias Stadium (6,080)
	Oldham	1876	Oldham, Greater Manchester	Boundary Park (13,513)
	Rochdale Hornets	1866	Rochdale, Greater Manchester	Spotland (10,000)
	St. Helens	1873	St. Helens, Merseyside	Brewdog Stadium (18,000)
	Salford Red Devils	1873	Salford, Greater Manchester	AJ Bell Stadium (12,000)
	Sheffield Eagles	1984	Sheffield, South Yorkshire	Steel City Stadium (3,900)
	Swinton Lions	1866	Swinton, Greater Manchester	Park Lane (3,000)
	Toulouse Olympique	1937	Toulouse, France	Stade Ernest-Wallon (19,500)
	Wakefield Trinity	1873	Wakefield, West Yorkshire	Belle Vue (12,000)
	Warrington Wolves	1876	Warrington, Cheshire	Halliwell Jones Stadium (15,300)
	Whitehaven	1948	Whitehaven, Cumbria	Recreation Ground (7,500)
	Widnes Vikings	1875	Widnes, Cheshire	Naughton Park (13,000)
	Wigan Warriors	1872	Wigan, Greater Manchester	Brick Community Stadium (20,000)
	Workington Town	1945	Workington, Cumbria	Derwent Park (10,000)
	York Knights	2002	York, North Yorkshire	York Community Stadium (8,500)

- *capacity for Rugby League games may differ from official stadium capacity.

=== Non-British clubs ===
France

- Catalans Dragons

In 2005 the new franchise was awarded to Catalans Dragons to play in the 2006 Super League. To help make sure the franchise did not fail as the PSG franchise did, the RFL allowed the Dragons to sign players from other French teams for no transfer fee. They were also promised to be exempted from relegation for 3 years. In their first season they finished bottom of the league but Castleford Tigers were the team relegated. Over the next few years they continually improved and in 2007 they became the first French team to reach a Challenge Cup Final. In 2018 they were the first non-British team to win the Challenge Cup.

- Toulouse Olympique

In 2009 Toulouse applied for a Super League licence but failed; however, the RFL were impressed with their application and invited them to play in the Championship. In their first season they finished the season 10th but were not relegated due to it being their first season in the British structure. In their second season they improved finishing 8th but missing out on the playoffs. In 2011 they were relegated but chose to return to the French Elite One Championship after they failed to get into Super League. In 2015 it was announced the RFL had invited them to play in League 1 from 2016 in the hope they can get promoted to Super League. Toulouse now play in the Championship, having earned promotion in their inaugural League 1 season of 2016.

== History ==
The first season of rugby league (1895–96) saw all the clubs play in a single league competition. The addition of new teams and the problems of travelling led to the league being split in two for the following season; into the Yorkshire League and the Lancashire League. In the 1897–98 season Lancashire added professional second and third competitions, but the third competition only lasted one season. Yorkshire added a professional second competition (split west and east to reduce travelling) for the 1898–99 season. The bottom teams from the senior competition played a promotion/relegation test match against the winner of their county's second competition. This arrangement lasted until the 1901–02, when the top clubs from each league formed a single new competition. This saw the Lancashire and Yorkshire Senior Leagues elect numerous clubs from the second competitions (5 from Lancashire and 7 from Yorkshire) with the second competitions subsequently scrapped and teams excluded from the senior competitions joining either the Lancashire Combination (reserve grade) and a new Yorkshire Senior League or reverting to amateur status, either within the Northern Union or in the case of many Yorkshire clubs back to rugby union. However, many clubs folded and some even switched to association football. The following season most of the remaining clubs in the Yorkshire and Lancashire Leagues were re-organised to form a Second Division, although four teams from the Yorkshire League and two from the Lancashire league were not elected to the new second division (but South Shields who had played in no league in 1901–02 were).

In 1905–06, the two divisions were re-combined into a single competition. Initially clubs arranged all their own fixtures with the condition that they had to play teams they do play both home and away. After this a new structure was introduced where clubs played all the teams in their own county on a home-and-away basis, results counting towards the re-formed Yorkshire and Lancashire Leagues, although due to imbalance in number of teams it was common for a Yorkshire club to have to play in the Lancashire League. They also had home-and-away fixtures scheduled against a small number of teams in the other competition (usually three); all results were collated into a single table for the Championship. In order to even up the competition a top-four play-off series was used to determine the Championship.

Apart from the interventions of the world wars, this system was retained until 1962–63, when the league briefly returned to a two divisional system. This lasted only two seasons, and in 1964–65 they went back to one large division subdivided into county leagues, but the play-off were expanded to the top 16 teams.

In 1973–74 they again went back to two divisions. The play-off and the Yorkshire and Lancashire League were abandoned, though a new play-off type competition, the Club Championship was introduced to replace the championship play-offs.

The following season saw the title change to Premiership and the format was altered so that only the top eight teams in the First Division would compete. A similar competition was later instituted for clubs in the lower league(s). In the 1991–92 and 1992–93 seasons, a Third Division was played. However, the league reverted to two divisions for the 1993–94 and 1994–95 seasons, controversially demoting three clubs to the National Conference League in the process.

In 1996 the Premiership was replaced by the Super League. The clubs outside of Super League played in the First Division which now came under Super League, and the clubs that previously played in Division Three now played in a retitled the Second Division.

Between 1999 and 2002, rugby league below Super League was re-organised into one large competition, the Northern Ford Premiership. In 2003, the NFP was divided into National Leagues 1 and 2 with a National League 3 made up from sides drawn from the Rugby League Conference and British Amateur Rugby League Association winter leagues. It was intended that at some future point promotion and relegation would be allowed between National League 3 and National League 2, however, in 2006 National League 3 was rebranded Rugby League Conference National Division and plans for promotion and relegation were scrapped.

In 2009, the National Leagues were renamed the Championship and Championship 1. Between 2009 and 2014 automatic promotion and relegation between Super League and the Championship was replaced by a franchise system. Teams in the Championship would have to apply for a licence to play in Super League. Licences were reviewed every 5 years.

In 2013, it was announced that there was to be a review into the structure of the Rugby League system in Europe. Clubs, fans and sponsors were asked about their needs from the system. Three options were reviewed; one system using two leagues of 10, with the Super League and Championship having one promotion and relegation place between the two. The format of promotion was to be decided later. The second option was the same system, with Promotion and Relegation between the two, but with 12 teams in each division. The third option was most radical, and featured two leagues of 12, which would, after 11 games, split to three groups of 8. This would be mixed with a new funding structure. On 17 January 2014, it was announced the third option had been selected, but had been changed to split after 23 games, which would be a complete round-robin and an added fixture, the Magic Weekend. From 2015, this was decided to be the new structure.

In preparation for the new structure, it was decided across the two leagues, Championship and Super League, there would be a season of realignment, in which five clubs would be relegated from the Championship, and one promoted to the Championship, and two teams would be relegated from the Super League to the Championship. This meant that the Super League, from 2015, would be made up of the 12 remaining teams from the Super League XIX season, and a Championship made up of the two relegated teams from the Super League, one team promoted from the 2014 Championship 1 and the nine remaining Championship teams. League 1, which would be modelled on the Championship, would be made out of the five relegated Championship teams, 8 current League 1 teams, and Coventry Bears.

== Men's structure ==
=== Tier 1: Super League ===
The top tier of rugby league in the United Kingdom is the Super League. It features 14 teams, with 12 teams from Northern England and 2 from France. The top six teams enter the play-offs and the winner is determined by the Super League Grand Final.

=== Tier 2: Championship ===
Below the Super League is the RFL Championship. A similar play-off structure which accumulates with the Championship Grand Final is used to determine the winners of the Championship. First place in regular season is awarded the RFL Championship Leaders' Shield.

=== Tier 3: National Leagues ===
The third tier is the National Leagues, which consists of two national divisions (National Premier League and National League One) and five regional National Conferences (Cumbria, North-West, Southern, Yorkshire A and Yorkshire B). The National Leagues are the highest level of amateur rugby league and form part of the National Community Rugby League.

- National Premier League
- National League One
- National Conferences:
  - Cumbria
  - North-West
  - Southern
  - Yorkshire A
  - Yorkshire B

=== Tier 4: Regional Leagues ===
Below the Conference League are a series of regional leagues, some of which still play in the winter, teams must apply to get promoted to the Conference Leagues.

- City of Hull and District League
- Cumbria Rugby League
- London and South East Rugby League
- East Rugby League
- Midlands Rugby League
- North East Rugby League
- North Wales Men's League
- North West Men's League
- Scottish National League
- South Wales Men's League
- South West Rugby League
- Yorkshire Men's League

=== Pyramid ===
Professional structure since 2026; Amateur structure since 2026; Number of clubs have varied by year.

Tier	League/Division										
Professional Leagues
1	Super League; 14 clubs – 0 relegated (Note: Promotion and relegation between the top two tiers is done via IMG Grading)										
2	Championship; 20 clubs – 0 promoted, 0 relegated										
Amateur Leagues
3	National Premier League; 12 clubs										
3	National League One; 12 clubs										
3	National Conference North West; 10 clubs	National Conference Yorkshire A + B 20 clubs			National Conference Cumbria; 10 clubs	National Conference Southern; 8 clubs					
4	North West Men's League	Yorkshire Men's League	North East Rugby League	City of Hull and District League	Cumbria Rugby League	London and South East Rugby League	East Rugby League	Midlands Rugby League	South West Rugby League	North Wales Men's League	South Wales Men's League

== Women's structure ==
The Women's Conference was the top tier of British rugby league until the RFL Women's Rugby League was introduced in 2012 with the aim of creating an elite top tier. This became the RFL Women's Super League in 2017, and also saw a second tier RFL Women's Championship introduced. The RFL Women's Super League South was introduced in 2021 to run parallel to the Super League, however this would become a second tier competition in the restructured Championship which started in 2024.

=== Pyramid ===
Structure from 2026.

Tier	League/Division		
1	Super League; 8 clubs – 1 relegated (playoff)		
2	National Championship; 12 clubs – 1 promoted (playoff)		
3	Northern League 1; 6 clubs	Midlands Championship; 6 clubs	Southern Championship (Note: Successor to RFL Women's Super League South); 8 clubs
3	Northern League 2; 8 clubs	Midlands Championship; 6 clubs	Southern Championship; 8 clubs
3	Northern League 3; 6 clubs	Midlands Championship; 6 clubs	Southern Championship; 8 clubs
4	Local Leagues (Details TBA: All division run parallel)		

== See also ==
- Rugby league in the British Isles
- Women's rugby league in Great Britain
- Australian rugby league system
- French rugby league system
- List of rugby league clubs in Britain
- IMG Grading for the British Rugby Football League
