= Wigan St Patricks =

English amateur rugby league club

Wigan St. Patricks

Club information
- Full name: Wigan St. Patricks; Amateur Rugby League Football Club
- Nickname: St. Pats
- Colours: Black and white
- Founded: 1910; 116 years ago
- Website: Official Club Website

Current details
- Ground: Clarington Park, Harper Street, Wigan, Greater Manchester WN1 3BN (2000)
- CEO: Jodie Whittle
- Coach: Dave Ruddy, Richard Owen
- Captain: Mel Alker
- Competition: NCL Division One

Wigan St. Patricks is an amateur rugby league football club based in the Scholes area of Wigan, Greater Manchester. The first team plays in the National Conference League Division One.

In 1986, the club was one of ten founder members of the BARLA National Amateur League (now known as the National Conference League).

The club is renowned for producing talented young players. More than 50 former St Pats players have gone on to play for the town's professional team, Wigan Warriors, and many have gone on to play Test rugby league, the highest level, for Great Britain and England RL including Joe Egan, Andy Gregory, John Fieldhouse, Joe Lydon, Andy Platt, Mike Gregory, Shaun Edwards, Martin Dermott, Shaun Wane, Ian Lucas, Phil Clarke, Chris Joynt, Mick Cassidy, Kris Radlinski, Sean O'Loughlin, Sam Tomkins, Liam Farrell, Josh Charnley, Tom Davies. and also Papua New Guinea international Lachlan Lam.

In 2014, St Pats reached the third round of the Challenge Cup, and were drawn against Leigh Centurions. Although St Pats were drawn at home, the club played the fixture at Leigh Sports Village, as their own ground did not meet the RFL's minimum requirements to host the fixture. St Pats were defeated 6–74.

In January 2015, the club announced that they would not be taking part in the 2015 Challenge Cup, as "it was not in the players or clubs interest to enter the competition this year". Although cup matches against professional opposition usually generate a significant financial windfall for amateur teams, St Pats revealed they had made just £63 from their Challenge Cup game against Leigh in the previous year due to the costs of hosting the game at another venue.

In 2017, St Pats' first round Challenge Cup tie against Leigh Miners Rangers was broadcast online on the BBC Sport website, and was the first time the opening round of the Challenge Cup had been shown live.

== Honours ==
- National Conference League Premier Division
  - Winners (1): 1991–92
- National Conference League Challenge Cup
  - Winners (1): 1991–92
- BARLA National Cup
  - Winners (1): 1987–88
- BARLA Lancashire Cup
  - Winners (1): 1983–84
