= BARLA National Cup =

British knock-out competition for amateur rugby league clubs

- Sport: Rugby league
- Instituted: 1973; 53 years ago
- Inaugural season: 1973-74
- Country: England
- Winners: Orrell St James (2024/25)

The BARLA National Cup is a knock-out competition for amateur rugby league clubs in Great Britain. It is administered by the British Amateur Rugby League Association (BARLA).

== Past winners ==
Final	Winner	Score	Runners-up
1973–74	Leigh MW	12–7	Latchford Albion
1974–75	Pilkington Recs	22–4	Rochdale Mayfield
1975–76	Ace Amateurs	20–12	Ovenden
1976–77	West Hull	10–3	NDLB
1977–78	Milford	22–13	Leigh MW
1978–79	Pilkington Recs	9–3	West Hull
1979–80	Pilkington Recs	16–5	Dewsbury Celtic
1980–81	Beecroft & Wightman	11–2	Lock Lane
1981–82	Pilkington Recs	19–2	Milford
1982–83	Leigh MW	12–8	Lock Lane
1983–84	Bradford Dudley Hill	24–16	Mysons
1984–85	Jubilee	26–10	West Hull
1985–86	Mysons	17–8	Millom
1986–87	Thatto Heath	15–8	Heworth
1987–88	St Patricks	28–8	Elland
1988–89	Crosfields	25–11	Kells
1989–90	Egremont	11–4	Saddleworth
1990–91	Saddleworth Rangers	27–14	Hull Dockers
1991–92	Hull Dockers	27–8	Skirlaugh
1992–93	Saddleworth Rangers	23–16	Hensingham
1993–94	Saddleworth Rangers	33–8	Thatto Heath Crusaders
1994–95	West Hull	7–6	Woolston
1995–96	Skirlaugh	21–16	Ellenborough Rangers
1996–97	Ellenborough Rangers	28–24	Bradford Dudley Hill
1997–98	Redhill	40–12	Ideal ABI
1998–99	Skirlaugh	32–2	Wath Brow Hornets
1999–00	Skirlaugh	36–30	Ideal Isberg
2000–01	Thatto Heath Crusaders	20–12	Featherstone Lions
2001–02	West Hull	36–10	Ince Rose Bridge
2002–03	Oldham St Annes	15–14	West Hull
2003–04	Wath Brow Hornets	25–19	Oldham St Annes
2004–05	Wath Brow Hornets	16–6	Skirlaugh
2005–06	Skirlaugh	26–13	Leigh Miners Rangers
2006–07	Halton Simms Cross	23–8	Ince Rose Bridge
2007–08	East Hull	32–10	Wath Brow Hornets
2008–09	Siddal	38–14	Wigan St Cuthberts
2009–10	Queens	17–7	Leigh East
2010–11	Sharlston Rovers	20–18	Fryston Warriors
2011–12	Queens	33–10	Sharlston Rovers
2012–13	Sharlston Rovers	31–30	Wibsey Warriors
2013–14	Sharlston Rovers	26–16	Hunslet Old Boys
2014–15	Egremont Rangers	34–16	Sharlston Rovers
2015–16	Thornhill Trojans	17–14	Myton Warriors
2016–17	Hunslet Club Parkside	39–10	Fryston Warriors
2017–18	West Hull	31–12	Haydock
2018–19	Thatto Heath Crusaders	20–19	West Hull
2019–20	No competition		COVID-19 pandemic
2020–21	No competition		COVID-19 pandemic
2021–22	Waterhead Warriors	42–0	Sharlston Rovers
2022–23	Siddal	30–10	Haresfinch
2023–24	Thatto Heath Crusaders	24–8	Orrell St James
2024–25	Orrell St James	54–0	Brighouse

== See also ==
- National Community Rugby League
- NCRL National Premier League
- NCRL National League One
- NCRL National Conferences
- Yorkshire Mens League
- Cumbria Rugby League
