= Saddleworth Rangers =

English amateur rugby league club

Club information
- Full name: Saddleworth Rangers; Amateur Rugby League Football Club
- Colours: Black and White
- Founded: 1930; 96 years ago

Current details
- Ground: The Jocky Wilson Stadium at Shaw Hall Bank Road, Greenfield, Saddleworth, Greater Manchester.
- Competition: NCL Division Three

Saddleworth Rangers are an amateur Rugby League side, formed in 1930, based at Shaw Hall Bank Road, Greenfield, Greater Manchester in the Saddleworth district of Oldham. The club has teams at a number of levels from junior to the first team, which competes in the National Conference League Division One. In 1993 they won the National Conference League Premier Division.

The clubs crest features both a white and red rose to reflect the Saddleworth area's historical routes of strong connections to both Yorkshire and Lancashire, the area having left Yorkshire administratively in 1974 to form part of Greater Manchester.

The club's ground, which has hosted Rugby League for over 60 years, features a small covered stand and a new clubhouse which was opened in 2016, fundraising included a world record attempt at a continuous game of touch rugby. The Clubhouse was named in honour of stalwart Terry Flanagan MBE, in a ceremony attended by the then Rugby League Chief Executive Nigel Woods and Chief Operating Office Ralph Rimmer. At almost 160m above sea level, the ground is one of the highest in Rugby League.

== History ==
Founder members of BARLA in 1973, and the National Conference League in 1986. History of the National Conference League

== Notable former players ==
• Paddy Kirwan

- Joe Greenwood
- James Greenwood
- Terry Flanagan MBE
- Mark Flanagan
- Josh Johnson
- Richard Russell
- Des Foy
- Ryan Maneely
- Ben White
- Jack Bradbury
- Nicky Kiss
- Terry Fogerty
- Alex Givvons
- Pasquale D’Adamo
- George Ford

== Honours ==
- National Conference League Premier Division
  - Winners (1): 1992–93
  - Runner Up (1): 1991–92
- National Conference League Division Two
  - Winners (1): 1989–90
- BARLA National Cup
  - Winners (3): 1990–91, 1992–93, 1993–1994
