= Pennine League =

Defunct rugby league competition in England

- Pennine League logo
- Sport: Rugby league
- Instituted: 1974
- Ceased: 2026
- Number of teams: 17
- Country: England
- Champions: Fryston Warriors (5th title) (2025/26)
- Most titles: Rochdale Mayfield (8)
- Website: pennineleague.co.uk

The Pennine Amateur Rugby League, or Pennine League was a rugby league competition for amateur open-age clubs that ran from September to April for clubs around the Pennines area. The competition was run by the British Amateur Rugby League Association (BARLA).

== History ==
The British Amateur Rugby League Association (BARLA), were formed in 1973 following a dispute with the Rugby Football League (RFL) regarding resources given to the amateur game. The following year BARLA merged local leagues in Bradford, Halifax, Huddersfield, Oldham, and Rochdale to create a new amateur competition, the Pennine League.

In 2004, BARLA realigned itself with the RFL, although the Pennine League continued to operate separately from the RFLs summer competitions in the Rugby League Conference that was founded in 1997.

In 2012, the RFL reformed the amateur structure of rugby league in Great Britain. BARLA's premier amateur competition, the National Conference League, switched to a summer season in line with this change, and became jointly administered by BARLA and the RFL. The Pennine League, again, was unaffected and decided to remain a winter competition. Since then, the number of teams declined.

In 2026, the Pennine League folded due to the RFLs restructure of the community game and dwindling participation. Its last winners were Fryston Warriors.

== Results ==
| Year | Winners | Runners up |
|---|---|---|
| 1975-76 | Oldham St Annes (1) | Rochdale Mayfield |
| 1976-77 | Rochdale Mayfield (1) | Ovenden |
| 1977-78 | Saddleworth Rangers (1) | Rochdale Mayfield |
| 1978-79 | Rochdale Mayfield (2) | West Bowling |
| 1979-80 | Rochdale Mayfield (3) | Waterhead Warriors |
| 1980-81 | Rochdale Mayfield (4) | Waterhead Warriors |
| 1981-82 | Rochdale Mayfield (5) | Waterhead Warriors |
| 1982-83 | Rochdale Mayfield (6) | Waterhead Warriors |
| 1983-84 | Rochdale Mayfield (7) | Waterhead Warriors |
| 1984-85 | Elland (1) | Rochdale Mayfield |
| 1985-86 | Bradford Dudley Hill (1) | Elland |
| 1986-87 | Elland (2) | Saddleworth Rangers |
| 1897-88 | Rochdale Mayfield (8) | Oldham St Annes |
| 1988-89 | Oldham St Annes (2) | Saddleworth Rangers |
| 1989-90 | Oldham St Annes (3) | West Bowling |
| 1990-91 | Moldgreen (1) | Park Amateurs |
| 1991-92 | Clayton (1) | West Bowling |
| 1992-93 | West Bowling (1) | Park Amateurs |
| 1993-94 | Ovenden (1) | Clayton |
| 1994-95 | Park Amateurs (1) | Ovenden |
| 1995-96 | West Bowling (2) | Park Amaturs |
| 1996-97 | Siddal (1) | West Bowling |
| 1997-98 | Clayton (2) | West Bowling |
| 1998-99 | Park Amateurs (2) | West Bowling |
| 1999-00 | Elland (2) | Underbank Rangers |
| 2000-01 | Elland (3) | Ovenden |
| 2001-02 | Elland (4) | Queensbury |
| 2002-03 | Elland (5) | Queensbury |
| 2003-04 | Elland (6) | Ovenden |
| 2004-05 | Drighlington (1) | Illingworth |
| 2005-06 | Drighlington (2) | Sharlston Rovers |
| 2006-07 | Drighlington (3) | Sharlston Rovers |
| 2007-08 | Halifax Irish (1) | Sharlston Rovers |
| 2008-09 | Sharlston Rovers (1) | Drighlington |
| 2009-10 | Drighlington (4) | Sharlston Rovers |
| 2010-11 | Queens (1) | Sharlston Rovers |
| 2011-12 | Drighlington (5) | Queens |
| 2012-13 | Sharlston Rovers (2) | Queens |
| 2013-14 | Hunslet Club Parkside (1) | Sharlston Rovers |
| 2014-15 | West Bowling (3) | Queens |
| 2015-16 | Fryston Warriors (1) | West Bowling |
| 2016-17 | Fryston Warriors (2) | Queens |
| 2017-18 | Ovenden (2) | Sharlston Rovers |
| 2018-19 | Ovenden (3) | Doncaster Toll Bar |
| 2019-20 | Upton (1) | Mirfield |
| 2020-21 | Cancelled due to Covid-19 Pandemic | |
| 2021-22 | Upton (2) | Westgate Common |
| 2022-23 | Fryston Warriors (3) | Mirfield |
| 2023-24 | Fryston Warriors (4) | Mirfield |
| 2024-25 | Cutsyke Raiders (1) | Kippax Welfare |
| 2025-26 | Fryston Warriors (5) | Woodhouse Warriors |

== See also ==
- British Amateur Rugby League Association
- British rugby league system
