= West Hull A.R.L.F.C. =

English amateur rugby league club

West Hull

Club information
- Full name: West Hull; Amateur Rugby League Football Club
- Colours: Green and Gold
- Founded: 1961; 65 years ago

Current details
- Ground: West Hull Community Park, Kingston upon Hull, East Riding of Yorkshire.
- Competition: NCRL National Premier League

West Hull A.R.L.F.C. is an amateur rugby league football club from Kingston upon Hull, currently playing in the NCRL National Premier League. The team plays their home matches at West Hull Community Park and their strip colours are green and gold.

== History ==
The club was formed in 1961 as Birds Eye A.R.L.F.C., named after the local factory where most of the players came from. Following the formation of the British Amateur Rugby League Association in 1971, the club was renamed to West Hull A.R.L.F.C.

In the 1973–74 season, the club won the inaugural BARLA Yorkshire Cup competition, defeating Illingworth in the final. In 1976–77, under the name Cawoods, they won the BARLA National Cup for the first time with a 10–3 win against National Dock Labour Board (now known as Hull Dockers). The following season, they became the first amateur team since 1909 to defeat a professional side when they won 9–8 against Halifax in the first round of the Players No. 6 Trophy.

In 1986, the club was one of ten founder members of the BARLA National Amateur League (now known as the National Conference League). The club won the National League championship for the first time in the 1988–89 season.

In 1996, West Hull reached the fifth round of the Challenge Cup, becoming the first amateur club to defeat professional opposition twice in the same year. The team won 35–20 in the third round tie against Highfield, followed by a 10–6 win in the next round against York in blizzard conditions at The Boulevard. The club went on to dominate the game at amateur level over the next few years, winning five National Conference League championships between 1997 and 2002.

In 2005, the club was relegated from the NCL Premier Division, but returned to the top flight a year later after finishing the 2005–06 season as champions of Division One.

== Honours ==
- National Conference League Premier Division
  - Winners (10): 1988–89, 1996–97, 1998–99, 1999–2000, 2000–01, 2001–02, 2013, 2014, 2020, 2025
- National Conference League Division One
  - Winners (2): 1991–92, 2005–06
- Conference Challenge Trophy
  - Winners (1): 2014
- BARLA National Cup
  - Winners (3): 1976–77, 1994–95, 2001–02
- BARLA Yorkshire Cup
  - Winners (5): 1973–74, 1981–82, 1984–85, 1987–88, 1988–89
