= Castleford Lock Lane =

English amateur rugby league club

Lock Lane ARLFC

Club information
- Full name: Lock Lane ARLFC
- Colours: Blue with white horizontal band shirts and blue shorts
- Founded: 1938; 88 years ago
- Website: www.pitchero.com/clubs/castlefordlocklanearlfc/

Current details
- Ground: Hicksons Arena, Lock Lane Sports Centre, Castleford
- Competition: NCRL National Premier League; Yorkshire Men's League; Pennine League

Lock Lane ARLFC are an amateur Rugby league Club in Castleford, West Yorkshire. Their home ground is the Hicksons Arena, part of the Lock Lane Sports Centre. The first team currently play in the NCRL National Premier League and the Academy team in the Yorkshire Men's League.

== History ==
The club were formed in 1938 as an intermediate U-21 side, but were temporarily disbanded for the duration of the Second World War. They were reformed in 1947 and in 1958 reached the proper rounds of the Challenge Cup for the first time. For a time during the 1960s, and 1970s, the club had no permanent home ground, having lost the use of their Sandy Desert ground. They moved to their current ground in 1995.

The club have played at the professional stage of the Challenge cup on 21 occasions. These include First Round Proper of the Challenge Cup on four occasions (1958, 1960, 1970 and 1974). In 1970, the club almost caused an upset in the Challenge Cup against Huddersfield at Fartown ground in a narrow 15–10 defeat. Following the restructuring of the Challenge Cup in the 1993–94 season, they have qualified for the third round of the Challenge Cup on eight successive occasions between 1995 and 2002, a record for an amateur club. They also reached the third round in 2004, 2005, 2007 (when they lost to the town's professional team, Castleford Tigers 88–10 after leading in the early stages 4–0) 2011, 2016 and 2019. In 2016, they lost in the 5th Round at Halifax after beating professional outfit Oxford Rugby League 37–18 in the 3rd round and local NCL side Featherstone Lions 30–16 in the 4th round. In 2026, Lock Lane went to the home of current Super League champions Hull Kingston Rovers in the 3rd round of the cup. Despite losing 0-104, the team did themselves proud.

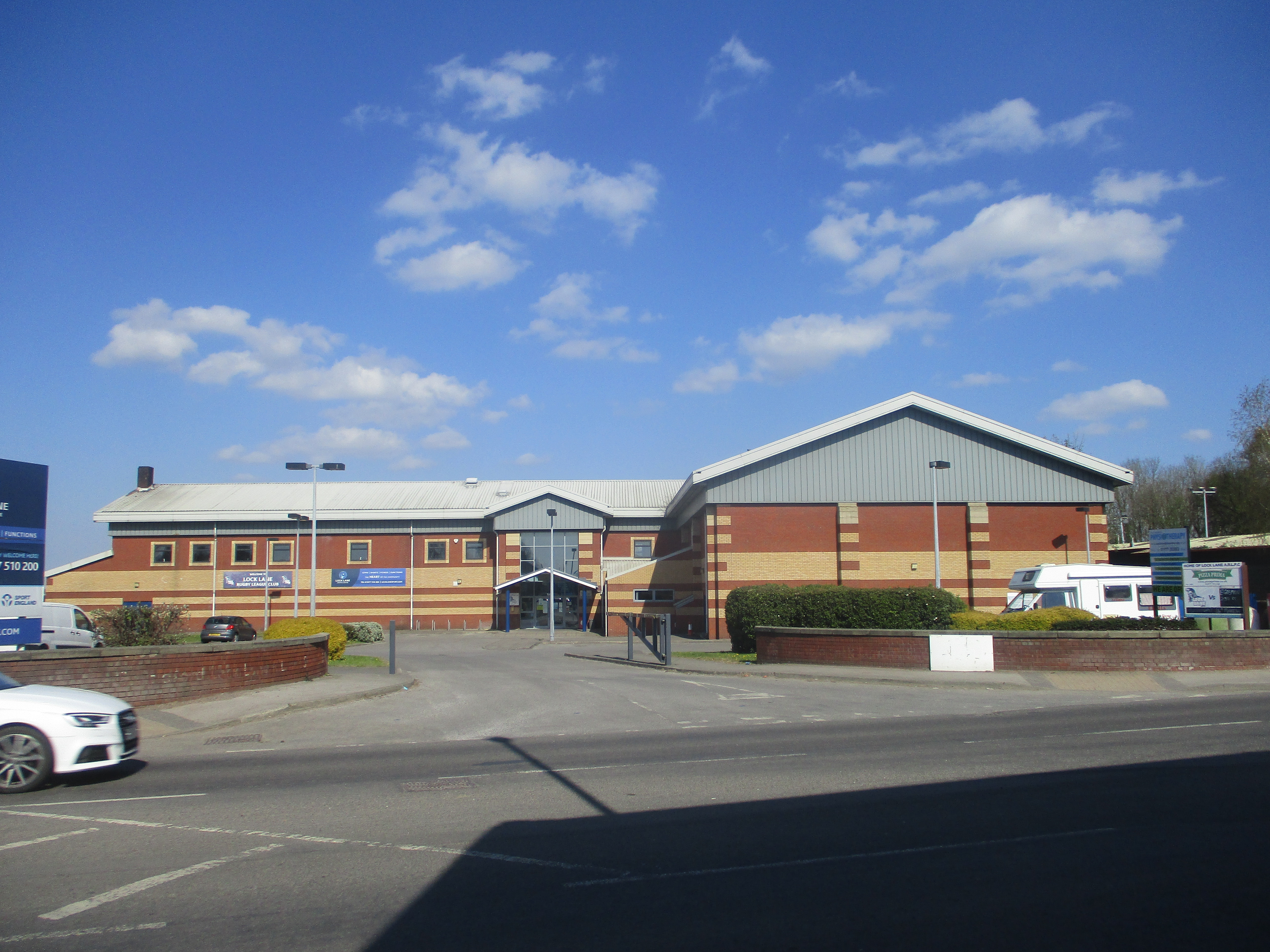
Lock Lane Sports Centre where Castleford Lock Lane play

Cup success was achieved when the club won the Yorkshire County Cup, a competition for amateur clubs only, 3 times in the 1950s as well as 1971–72 and the BARLA Yorkshire County Cup in 1981–82, 2017–18 and 2018–19. The club have also reached the National Cup Final in 1981 and 1983, losing to Beecroft & Wightman (11–2) and Leigh Miners Welfare (12–8) respectively.

== Club sides ==
The club run an open age First team and an Academy team alongside youth sides at U17 and U18 as well as twelve Junior sides from U7 to U16.

== Honours ==
- BARLA Yorkshire Cup
  - Winners (3): 1982–83, 2017–18, 2018–19

== Notable players ==
Players who have represented the club include:

- Grant Anderson (also played for Castleford Tigers)
- Joe Anderson (also played for Castleford, Leeds & Featherstone Rovers)
- Paul Anderson (also played for St Helens & Bradford Bulls & Great Britain)
- Mark Aston (also played for Sheffield Eagles & Featherstone Rovers)
- Chris Bibb (also played for Featherstone Rovers & Great Britain)
- Ryan Boyle (also played for Castleford Tigers, Salford City Reds & Ireland)
- Paul Broadbent (also played for Sheffield Eagles, Halifax & Great Britain)
- Harry Burton (also played for Wakefield Trinity)
- Ben Crooks (also played for Hull)
- John Davies (also played for Castleford Tigers, Dewsbury Rams & Featherstone Rovers)
- Greg Eden (also played for Castleford Tigers, Huddersfield Giants & Hull Kingston Rovers)
- Gareth Ellis (also played for Wakefield Trinity Wildcats, Leeds Rhinos, Wests Tigers (Australia) & Great Britain)
- Harry Poole (rugby league) (also played for Hull Kingston Rovers, Hunslet & Great Britain)
- Michael Gibbins (also played for Dewsbury Rams & Batley Bulldogs)
- John Sheridan (also played for Castleford)
- Daniel Smith (also played for Castleford, Leeds Rhinos, Wakefield Trinity, Featherstone Rovers & Huddersfield Giants)
- Liam Watts (also played for Castleford Tigers, Hull Kingston Rovers & Hull)
- Joe Westerman (also played for Castleford Tigers & Hull)
- Ben Johnston (Castleford Tigers and Halifax Blue Sox)
