= Wath Brow Hornets =

English amateur rugby league club, based in Cleator Moor, Cumbria

Club information
- Full name: Wath Brow Hornets; Amateur Rugby League Football Club
- Nickname: Hornets
- Colours: Black; Yellow
- Founded: 1898; 128 years ago

Current details
- Ground: The Club House, Wath Brow, Cleator, CA23 3EW
- Competition: NCRL National Premier League

Uniforms
Home colours

Wath Brow Hornets are an amateur rugby league football club from Cleator Moor, Cumbria. The club currently competes in the NCRL National Premier League. The club also operates a number of academy teams.

== History ==
The game of rugby of one sorts or another has been played in the Wath Brow area of Cleator Moor for many a long year, Prior to the great breakaway in 1895 there was a rugby union team with the name now associated to the rugby league club.

The original Wath Brow RL, or Northern Union as it was originally known, was founded in 1898, when a Mr. Wilson represented Cumberland in the first ever County Championship against Cheshire.

Rugby football had been played in the Wath Brow area of Cleator Moor for many years before the schism of 1895. The original Hornets club was formed in 1898, just a few years after the breakaway and decided to play the northern union code of rugby. The club disbanded in 1904.

A new club with the same name was formed in 1920. This club however, disbanded at the start of World War II in 1939.

The current incarnation of the club was formed in 1955 and joined the National Conference League in 2002.

== Former notable players ==
- Leroy Joe
- James Donaldson (rugby league)

== Honours ==
- National Conference League Premier Division
  - Winners (1): 2012, 2019
- National Conference League Premier Division
  - Winners (1): 2003–04, 2008–09
- National Conference League Division Two
  - Winners (1): 2002–03
- BARLA National Cup
  - Winners (2): 2003–04, 2004–05
- BARLA Cumbria Cup
  - Winners (4): 1998–99, 1999–2000, 2000–01, 2001–02
- Cumberland League
  - Winners (6): 1975-76, 1976-75, 1997–98, 1999-00, 2000–01, 2001–02
