= Pilkington Recs =

English amateur rugby league club

- Pilkington Shield

Club information
- Full name: Pilkington Recs A.R.L.F.C
- Colours: Red, amber and black
- Founded: 1949; 77 years ago
- Website: www.pilkingtonrecs.org

Current details
- Grounds: Ruskin Drive, St. Helens (2011–Present); City Road, St. Helens (1949–2011)
- Competition: National Conference League

The Recs Rugby Football Club is an amateur rugby league team based in St Helens, Merseyside.

== History ==
In 1949 a group of Pilkington Glass employees submitted an application to the Pilkington Recreation Club Committee at Grove Street to form an amateur rugby league team. Their first match was on 27 August 1949 against a local amateur side, Vine Tavern, and was played away. The Recs lost 32–3 in front of a 2,000 strong crowd. However, later in the season the Recs won a return match by 15–13 in front of an estimated 4,000 crowd.

On 13 February 1977 the Recs drew a home fixture in the Challenge Cup against Wigan. The game was played at Knowsley Road, as the City Road venue could not accommodate the number of spectators expected.

They were among nine clubs invited to join the National Conference League for the 2013 season. Pilks started in NCL Division 3 (4th tier), however 3 consecutive promotions in their first 3 seasons means as of 2016, Pilks competed in the NCL Premier Division for the first time since 1989.

In the 2016 Challenge Cup, Pilks were drawn at home to League One outfit London Skolars for the 3rd round. Despite an instant offer from St Helens to play the game at Langtree Park, Pilks managed to gain acceptance from the Rugby Football League (RFL) to play the game at Ruskin Drive after it met a suitability criteria. Recs won that fixture 13–0 in front of a sell out crowd of 750 people. Playing in the 4th round of the competition, on 19 March 2016 Pilks lost 0–78 to Halifax at 'home' in the Challenge Cup 4th round, the game was played at Langtree Park in front of 987 people.

In 2019, Pilks won their first National Conference League championship, winning Division One

== Club house fire ==
On 10 June 2011, it was reported that the team's clubhouse on City Road was on fire. Club officials, who had been alerted to the blaze, scrambled to save kit and equipment from the changing rooms before the fire tore through the building.

== Honours ==
- National Conference League Division One
  - Winners (3): 2019
- BARLA National Cup
  - Winners (4): 1974–75, 1978-79, 1979-80, 1981-82
- BARLA Lancashire Cup
  - Winners (4): 1974-75, 1976-77, 1978-79, 1980-81
- BARLA Intercounty Cup
  - Winners (1): 1980-81
- North West Mens League Premier Division
  - Winners (1): 2012
- North West Counties Rugby League Premier Division
  - Winners (2): 1977-78, 1978-80
- North West Counties Rugby League Premier Cup
  - Winners (3): 2007-08, 2010-11, 2011-12
- North West Counties League Division One
  - Winners (4): 1975-76, 1985-86, 1991-92, 2004-05

== Notable players ==
- Tom Armstrong
- Bob Dagnall
- Geoff Fletcher
- Gareth Haggerty
- Carl Forster
- Gareth Frodsham
- Kurt Haggerty
- Luke Thompson
- Dave McConnell
- Noah Stephens
