= British Amateur Rugby League Association =

UK association for social and recreational rugby league

- Founded: 1973
- RFL affiliation: 2004
- Responsibility: United Kingdom: social and recreational
- Headquarters: West Yorkshire House, New North Parade, Huddersfield, UK
- Key people: Spen Allison (President); Sue Taylor MBE (Chair)
- Website: barla.org.uk

(United Kingdom)
- As of 1 July 2009

The British Amateur Rugby League Association (BARLA) is an association for social and recreational rugby league. It works jointly with the Rugby Football League through the RFL Community Board.

== History ==
BARLA was created on 3 March 1973 at the George Hotel in Huddersfield by a group of clubs believing that the Rugby Football League were not doing enough to support the amateur game. The RFL voted 29–1 against the recognition of BARLA, with Tom Mitchell being the only one to vote in favour. A subsequent vote twelve months later following a change in the RFL board, resulted in a unanimous vote of approval for BARLA.

One of BARLA's first acts was to merge the vast majority of the district leagues into five regional leagues: the Yorkshire League (initially still called the Leeds & District League), the short-lived Cumbria League, the West Yorkshire Sunday League, the Pennine League, and the North Western Counties League. For geographical reasons, the Hull & District League (renamed Humberside League) and the Southern League were left unmerged. This allowed clubs to play at more appropriate standards as there were more divisions, and this factor along with the improved governance of BARLA saw the standard and numbers of clubs rise quickly.

The Yorkshire County Cup and Lancashire County Cup knock-out competitions were started in 1973 as well as the BARLA National Cup.

In 1977 BARLA toured Australia and New Zealand for the first time. In that year the BARLA Young Lions made their first inaugural tour setting a lasting trend by giving future stars of the game such as David Hobbs their first taste of international rugby league.

A Cumbria County Cup was started in 1982.

The BARLA National League was introduced for the 1986–87 season. The inaugural season featured 10 teams.

The association has always been a champion of the amateur ethos and in 1987 BARLA played a major role in the establishment of the 'free gangway' between the two codes at an amateur level. The agreement allowed players to inter-change between rugby league and rugby union without fear of discrimination.

The BARLA National League soon proved popular and the 1989–90 season also saw the addition of a second division.

On 30 November 1990, BARLA's new headquarters at West Yorkshire House, Huddersfield was opened by Queen Elizabeth II.

In 1993, BARLA provided the first Great Britain team to tour South Africa. The BARLA National League was rebranded as the National Conference League and expanded to three divisions (now named premier, first, and second) in 1993.

By 1999, there were more than 1,400 teams and 900 youth and junior teams. On an average weekend in the season, almost 23,000 players will be in action.

BARLA's work in the international expansion of the game was recognised by their inclusion as affiliate members of the International Federation (equivalent to the International Board at the time) in 1999 and by BARLA's inclusion in the Emerging Nations World Championship in 2000.

BARLA won the Emerging Nations World Championship beating Italy 20–14 in the final.

In 2004, BARLA realigned itself with the RFL following pressure from Sport England regarding funding.

== Competitions ==
=== Leagues ===
BARLA has run amateur leagues in the heartlands since its foundation in 1973. The non-heartlands amateur competition was set up by the Rugby League Conference in 1997. BARLA competitions are as follows:

- National Conference League
  - Premier Division
  - Division One
  - Division Two
  - Division Three
- Barrow & District A.R.L.
- Bradford & District A.R.L.
- Carlisle & District A.R.L.
- City & County of Kingston Upon Hull & District A.R.L.
- Cumberland A.R.L.
- Halifax A.R.L.
- Heavy Woolen A.R.L.
- Huddersfield & District A.R.L.
- Keighley A.R.L.
- Oldham A.R.L.
- Pennine A.R.L.
- Rochdale A.R.L.
- Wakefield & District A.R.L.
- Warrington ARL
- Widnes & District A.R.L.
- Wigan A.R.L.
- York & District A.R.L.

Follow BARLA's alignment with the RFL in 2004 and the 2012 restructure of amateur rugby league in Great Britain, a number of BARLA league have formed part of the British rugby league system. These are:

- Tier 4: National Conference League
- Tier 5: Cumberland A.R.L (as Cumbria Rugby League), and City & County of Kingston Upon Hull & District A.R.L. (as City of Hull and District League)

Merging of certain BARLA and RLC league created the other Tier 5 heartlands league - North West Men's League, Yorkshire Men's League, and North East Rugby League.

=== Cups ===
- BARLA National Cup (est. 1973)
- BARLA Lancashire Cup (est. 1973)
- BARLA Yorkshire Cup (est. 1973)
- BARLA Cumbria Cup (est. 1982)

== Representative sides ==
BARLA selects an international team consisting of community players, the BARLA Lions. This team tours many parts of the rugby league world and has competed in the Rugby League Emerging Nations Tournament. The association has made 31 tours to and from the Southern Hemisphere. These include pioneer visits with matches against Fiji, Samoa, Tonga, the Cook Islands, and South Africa. In the Northern Hemisphere, games have been played against Moldova, Russia, Morocco and Pakistan.

=== BARLA National ===
A Great Britain Amateur representative side, with players selected from BARLA clubs, competed in the 2000 Emerging Nations Tournament. BARLA finished top of Group A beating Morocco 60–2 and Japan 54–0 to qualify for the Final in which they beat Italy 20–14.

=== BARLA Lancashire ===
An amateur Lancashire team won a friendly against Malta 62–0 in 2010.

== See also ==
- Rugby Football League
- Rugby league in the British Isles
