= East Leeds A.R.L.F.C. =

English amateur rugby league club

East Leeds

Club information
- Full name: East Leeds; Amateur Rugby League Football Club
- Nickname: Owls
- Colours: Red and White
- Founded: 1979; 47 years ago

Current details
- Ground: Richmond Hill, 81 Easy Road, Leeds, LS9 8QS
- Competition: National Conference League

East Leeds are an amateur rugby league football club from Leeds, West Yorkshire. The club currently competes in the National Conference League. The club also operates a number of junior teams.

Founded by Glen Davies and Rod Keeligan, East Leeds ARLC began life in 1979 as an under-11’s team. Run from the Black Dog Pub they were called the Black Dog Pups. When the teams expanded the next season it moved to East Leeds Working Men’s club. The club closed in 2008, leaving East Leeds ARLFC playing out of Harehills Liberal Club. In 2010 the team got funding and took ownership of the building previously owned by East Leeds Working men’s club. The building is owned by a registered charity called East Leeds Community Sports Club Registered Charity Number 1137140

== Notable players ==
Leroy Rivett, Richie Mathers, Danny McGuire, Chris Clarkson, Mikołaj Olędzki, Lois Forsell, Rob Roberts, Sam Eseh and Cai Taylor-Wray.
