= Hull Dockers =

English amateur rugby league club

Hull Dockers ARLFC

Club information
- Full name: Hull Dockers ARLFC
- Colours: Green and white
- Founded: 1880; 146 years ago
- Website: http://www.pitchero.com/clubs/hulldockers

Current details
- Ground: The Willows Sports and Social Club, EastMount Recreational Centre
- Competition: National Conference League, City of Hull & District Rugby League

Uniforms
Home colours

Hull Dockers ARLFC is an amateur rugby league team from Kingston upon Hull, with teams ranging from U4 (diddy dockers) to open age playing in the National Conference League. They currently play their home matches at The Willows, Holderness Road and Eastmount playing fields, Longhill. Their playing colours are more traditionally green and white hoops. The team experienced rapid growth between 2012 and 2019, with numbers reaching the 200 mark.

== Honours ==
- BARLA National Cup
  - Winners (1): 1991–92
- BARLA Yorkshire Cup
  - Winners (1): 1991–92
