= Dewsbury Celtic =

English amateur rugby league club

Club information
- Full name: Dewsbury Celtic; Rugby League Football Club
- Colours: Green and White Hoops
- Founded: 1879; 147 years ago
- Website: www.dewsburycelticrlfc.co.uk

Current details
- Ground: Crow Nest Park 53°43′10.94″N 1°48′00.75″W
- Competition: NCL Division Two

Dewsbury Celtic is a rugby league club in the town of Dewsbury, West Yorkshire. They play in the NCL Division Two under Head Coach Scott Dyson. Mark Brierley also coaches alongside, adding to the coaching expertise.

Boasting a strong amateur youth contingency, Celtic hold numerous age groups in the Yorkshire Juniors divisions.

Proud to be one of the oldest clubs in amateur rugby league (Est. 1879).

== History ==
Dewsbury Celtic is one of the oldest Irish sports clubs in Yorkshire. The origins of Dewsbury Celtic can be directly linked to Ireland’s Great Famine of 1845. Official records show that in 1845 200 Irish immigrants were living in Daw Green, Westtown, Dewsbury. By 1851 the number had risen to 1,000 working mainly as labourers and mill workers.

Having started as Dewsbury Shamrocks in 1879, they switched in the late 1890s to football, returning to rugby league in 1910. At this point they joined what was then the Northern Union and changed their name to Dewsbury Celtic. They became one of the best local teams and won the Yorkshire County Amateur Cup in 1912–13. This team was torn apart by the First World War, losing 15 players. They reformed in 1919 and then disbanded again in 1939 at the start of the Second World War.

In the post-war period the club reformed and became one of the most famous names in amateur rugby league, and their name was feared by professional clubs drawn against them in the Rugby League Challenge Cup. Celtic continued to win trophies on a regular basis, including the Yorkshire Cup, Leeds League titles and George Oldroyd Trophy 13 times between 1953 and 1969.

In recent times, other local teams have overtaken Celtic in the league structure and in an effort to revitalise the club they switched to summer rugby in 2005, taking over the fixtures of the defunct Manchester Knights in the Central Premier. In 2006 they applied for National League Three, finishing in 5th place and qualifying for the play-offs, where they lost to St Albans Centurions.

In 2007, National League Three was rebranded as the Rugby League Conference National Division and Celtic were one of six Yorkshire teams in the ten-team league. They achieved their highest place to date with a very good 4th place. They also competed in the Northern Rail Cup, finishing behind Bramley Buffaloes, who qualified for the knock-out stages.

In 2019 Dewsbury Celtic competed in the Kingstone Press NCL (Division Three) competing against teams from all over the country. Brendan Sheridan and Mark Brierley coached them to win promotion in an outstanding play-off final win over Heworth ARLFC, gaining promotion to the NCL Division 2.

Shortly after this, Celtic toured Australia in November 2019 returning to England with one win under their belt down under. They beat Penshurst RSL 4–10 but fell short in their second battle to De La Salle losing 34–10. Soon after a successful season, Head coach Brendan Sheridan was appointed assistant coach at Oldham RLFC in the Betfred Championship.

In 2020, Paul Heaton, Mark Brierley and Dom Byrne took on the challenge of keeping Celtic up in the second division.

== Honours ==
- 2022 Jim Brown cup winners open age
- National Conference Division 3 Play-Off Final Winners: 2019
- BARLA U18’s Yorkshire Cup Winners v West Hull 1999
- BARLA U18s Yorkshire Cup Winners: V Stanningley2016/2017
- 2013 Jim Brown cup winners open age
- Yorkshire U18s Youth Cup Winners: V Milford 2010
- Yorkshire U18s Youth Cup Winners: V Upton 2008
- Yorkshire Cup Winners: 1914/15, 1964/65, 1971/72, 1973/74
- Yorkshire Cup Runners: Up 1958/59
- BARLA Yorkshire Cup Winners: 1974/75, 1976/77
- BARLA Yorkshire Cup Runners Up: 1975/76, 1999/2000
- BARLA National Cup Runners Up: 1980
- National Conference League Div 2 Runners Up: 1991/92
- Rugby Leaguer Cup Winners: V Pilkingtons 1972
- Leeds League Div 1 Champions: 1962, 1965, 1974
- Leeds League Div 2 Champions: 1967
- George Oldroyd Trophy Winners: 1953, 1955, 1956, 1959, 1960, 1961, 1962, 1963, 1964, 1965,1966, 1967, 1969, 1971, 1973
- Donald Green Memorial Cup Winners: 1972, 1974
- Rose Bowl winners: 1952
- Huddersfield Examiner Trophy Winners: 1972, 1974
- Bernard Lee Memorial Trophy Winners: 1974
- Bill Norfolk Cup Winners: 1977
- West Yorkshire Challenge Cup/Championship Cup/League Cup Treble: 1977
- Yorkshire League Premier Div Champions: 1988/89
- Yorkshire League Senior Div Champions: 1998/99, 2003/04
- Yorkshire League Senior Div Top Four playoff Winners: 1998/99
- Yorkshire League Senior Cup Winners: 1998/99
- Yorkshire League Senior Cup Runners Up: 2000/01
- Heavy Woollen Jim Brown Cup Winners 32 times since 1954/55
- Johnny Harpin Memorial Trophy Winners v Thornhill 2023,2024

== Juniors ==
Dewsbury Celtic run junior teams in the Yorkshire Juniors' league
