= 2014 Women's Challenge Cup =

Women's rugby league competition

- Winners: Thatto Heath St Helens
- Runners-up: Bradford Thunderbirds
- Biggest home win: Bradford Thunderbirds 78 – 0 Oulton Raidettes
- Biggest away win: West Craven Warriors 4 – 76 Army RL

The 2014 Women's Challenge Cup was an English rugby league knockout tournament competed for during the summer of 2014. The Challenge Cup was won by Thatto Heath St Helens who beat Bradford Thunderbirds 32–24 in the final. The Challenge Shield was won by Fetherstone Rovers who beat Stanningley 64–14 in the final. Both finals took place on 3 August 2014 at the Tetley's Stadium, Dewsbury.

== Preliminary round ==
Matches in the preliminary round took place on 27 April and 4 May:

- Cumbria Crusaders 0 – 46 Wigan St Patricks
- Oulton Raidettes 20 – 18 Selby Warriors

== Round One ==
The first round took place on 11 May:

- Bradford Thunderbirds 48 – 6 Stanningley
- Fryston Warriors 70 – 6 Hunslet Hawks
- Normanton Knights 22 – 20 Featherstone Rovers
- Rochdale Hornets 8 – 18 Oulton Raidettes
- West Craven Warriors 4 – 76 Army RL

== Round Two ==
The second round took place on 15 June:

- Bradford Thunderbirds 78 – 0 Oulton Raidettes
- Brighouse 8 – 48 Fryston Warriors
- Thatto Heath St Helens 30 – 16 Army RL
- Normanton Knights – ?

== Semi Finals ==
The semi-finals had been completed before 24 July when the venue for the final was confirmed.

== Final ==
The fixture was a repeat of the 2013 Final which had been won by Thatto Heath. The 2014 final took place on 3 August at the Tetley's Stadium, Dewsbury. The score was Thatto Heath St Helens 32–24 Bradford Thunderbirds.

3 August 2014

Bradford Thunderbirds	24 – 32	Thatto Heath St Helens
Tries: Charlotte Booth, Lois Forsell (3), Charlene Henegan; Goals: Rhiannon Marshall (2)	report	Tries: Alex Simpson (2), Jennie Pendelbury, Jodie Cunningham, Emily Rudge, Tara Jones; Goals: Faye Gaskin (4)

Tetley's Stadium, Dewsbury
Player of the Match: Amy Smith (Thatto Heath)

== Challenge Shield ==
=== Shield Round One ===
The first round took place on 15 June:

- Rochdale Hornets 0 – 72 Featherstone Rovers
- Selby Warriors 30 – 14 West Craven Warriors
- Stanningley 34 – 16 Leigh Miners Rangers

=== Shield Semi Finals ===
The semi-finals had been completed before 24 July when the venue for the final was confirmed.

=== Shield Final ===
The final took place on 3 August 2014 at the Tetley's Stadium, Dewsbury. The score was Featherstone Rovers 64–14 Stanningley.

3 August 2014

Featherstone Rovers	64 – 14	Stanningley
Tries: Andrea Dobson (3), Kayleigh Bulman (4), Natalie Gilmour (2), Brogan Churm (2); Goals: Katie Cooper Birkenhead, Natalie Gilmour (9)	report	Tries: Sarah Dunn, Jodie Litherland, Ellanor Trumper; Goals: Jodie Litherland

Tetley's Stadium, Dewsbury
Player of the Match: Brogan Churm
