= 2021 RFL Women's Super League results =

English rugby league season

The fixture list for the first part of the 2021 season was issued on 28 March 2021.

All times are UK local time (UTC+1) on the relevant dates.

== Regular season ==
=== Round 1 ===
Home	Score	Away	Match Information
Home	Score	Away	Date and Time	Venue	Attendance (Note: Matches played behind closed doors under UK government COVID-19 regulations.)
Castleford Tigers	40–6	Featherstone Rovers	18 April 2021, 12:00	Sport Park Weetwood, Leeds	—N/a
Warrington Wolves	8–52	Wigan Warriors	18 April 2021, 12:00	Victoria Park, Warrington	—N/a
Bradford Bulls	0–86	St Helens	18 April 2021, 15:00	Victoria Park, Warrington	—N/a
Leeds Rhinos	68–16	York City Knights	18 April 2021, 15:00	Sport Park Weetwood, Leeds	—N/a

=== Round 2 ===
Home	Score	Away	Match Information
Home	Score	Away	Date and Time	Venue	Referee	Attendance
Featherstone Rovers	0–72	Leeds Rhinos	2 May 2021, 12:00	Mobile Rocket Stadium, Wakefield	A. Sweet	—N/a
Wigan Warriors	38–0	Bradford Bulls	2 May 2021, 12:00	Victoria Park, Warrington		—N/a
St Helens	90–0	Huddersfield Giants	2 May 2021, 15:30	Victoria Park, Warrington		—N/a
Wakefield Trinity	0–44	Castleford Tigers	2 May 2021, 15:30	Mobile Rocket Stadium, Wakefield		—N/a

=== Round 3 ===
Home	Score	Away	Match Information
Home	Score	Away	Date and Time	Venue	Referee	Attendance
Bradford Bulls	20–28	Huddersfield Giants	16 May 2021, 15:00	Victoria Park, Warrington	M. Smaill	—N/a
Featherstone Rovers	14–42	York City Knights	16 May 2021, 15:00	Mobile Rocket Stadium, Wakefield		—N/a
Wakefield Trinity	6–74	Leeds Rhinos	16 May 2021, 15:00	Mobile Rocket Stadium, Wakefield		—N/a
Warrington Wolves	6–54	St Helens	16 May 2021, 15:00	Victoria Park, Warrington		—N/a

=== Round 4 ===
Home	Score	Away	Match Information
Home	Score	Away	Date and Time	Venue	Referee	Attendance
Huddersfield Giants	10–68	Wigan Warriors	30 May 2021, 15:00	Victoria Park, Warrington		—N/a
Wakefield Trinity	10–52	Featherstone Rovers	30 May 2021, 15:00	Weetwood Sports Park, Leeds		—N/a
Warrington Wolves	28–40	Bradford Bulls	30 May 2021, 15:00	Victoria Park, Warrington		—N/a
York City Knights	18–20	Castleford Tigers	30 May 2021, 15:00	Weetwood Sports Park, Leeds		—N/a

=== Round 5 ===
Home	Score	Away	Match Information
Home	Score	Away	Date and Time	Venue	Referee	Attendance
Huddersfield Giants	8–44	Warrington Wolves	13 June 2021, 15:00	Victoria Park, Warrington	B. Millington	—N/a
Castleford Tigers	C–C	Leeds Rhinos	—N/a (Note: Match originally scheduled for 13 June postponed, no medical cover available.) (Note: With the mid-season break brought forward, all outstanding games from rounds one to nine were cancelled.)
St Helens	C–C	Wigan Warriors	—N/a (Note: Match postponed under the RFL COVID-19 protocols after a St Helens player tested positive and several others ordered to self-isolate.)
Wakefield Trinity	C–C	York City Knights	—N/a

=== Round 6 ===
Home	Score	Away	Match Information
Home	Score	Away	Date and Time	Venue	Referee	Attendance
Bradford Bulls	10–42	Leeds Rhinos	20 June 2021, 12:00	Mobile Rocket Stadium, Wakefield		—N/a
York City Knights	24–0 (Note: Match forfeited by St Helens as they were unable to field a team due to injuries and players self-isolating after COVID-19 testing. As the number of players affected by COVID-19 was less than seven the game could not be postponed under the RFL COVID-19 protocols. Under the RFL operational rules, forfeited games are classed as a 24–0 victory for the non-forfeiting team.)	St Helens	—N/a
Wigan Warriors	22–8	Castleford Tigers	20 June 2021, 12:00	Victoria Park, Warrington	L. Bland	—N/a
Warrington Wolves	52–14	Wakefield Trinity	20 June 2021, 15:00	Victoria Park, Warrington		—N/a
Huddersfield Giants	18–28	Featherstone Rovers	21 June 2021, 19:45	Odsal Stadium, Bradford		—N/a

=== Round 7 ===
Home	Score	Away	Match Information
Home	Score	Away	Date and Time	Venue	Referee	Attendance
Leeds Rhinos	56–0	Warrington Wolves	4 July 2021, 12:00	The Mobile Rocket Stadium	J. Vella
Huddersfield Giants	40–14	Wakefield Trinity	4 July 2021, 15:30	The Mobile Rocket Stadium
Featherstone Rovers	10–36	Wigan Warriors	4 July 2021, 15:30	The Millennium Stadium
Castleford Tigers	6–38	St Helens	5 July 2021, 19:45	Odsal Stadium
Bradford Bulls	0–24 (Note: Bradford forfeited the game after being unable to raise a team due to injuries and player availability.)	York City Knights	—N/a

=== Round 8 ===
Home	Score	Away	Match Information
Home	Score	Away	Date and Time	Venue	Referee	Attendance
Huddersfield Giants	C–C	Castleford Tigers	—N/a (Note: Match postponed due to lack of medical cover at venue.)
York City Knights	62–0	Warrington Wolves	13 July 2021, 20:00 (Note: Match rescheduled from 11 July 2021.)	Victoria Park, Warrington
St Helens	78–0	Featherstone Rovers	11 July 2021, 12:00	Victoria Park, Warrington
Wigan Warriors	6–28	Leeds Rhinos	11 July 2021, 15:00	Victoria Park, Warrington
Bradford Bulls	46–6	Wakefield Trinity	12 July 2021, 19:45	Odsal Stadium, Bradford	L. Bland

=== Round 9 ===
Home	Score	Away	Match Information
Home	Score	Away	Date and Time	Venue	Referee	Attendance
Leeds Rhinos	24–0	Huddersfield Giants	—N/a (Note: Huddersfield forfeited the match after advising they would be unable to raise a team.)
Bradford Bulls	12–42	Featherstone Rovers	18 July 2021, 15:30	Millennium Stadium, Featherstone
Warrington Wolves	12–48	Castleford Tigers	18 July 2021, 12:00	Victoria Park, Warrington	Mackenzie Maddison
St Helens	24–0	Wakefield Trinity	—N/a (Note: Wakefield forfeited match after informing RFL they were unable to raise a team.)
Wigan Warriors	4–12	York City Knights	19 July 2021, 19:45	Odsal Stadium, Bradford

== Women's Super League playoffs ==
=== Round 1 ===
Home	Score	Away	Match Information
Home	Score	Away	Date and Time	Venue	Referee
Castleford Tigers	6–28	Leeds Rhinos	21 August 2021, 16:15	Mend-A-Hose Jungle, Castleford
St Helens	32–0	York City Knights	22 August 2021, 14:00	Totally Wicked Stadium, St. Helens	J. McMullen

=== Round 2 ===
Home	Score	Away	Match Information
Home	Score	Away	Date and Time	Venue	Referee
Wigan Warriors	6–10	Castleford Tigers	29 August 2021, 15:00	Robin Park Arena
York City Knights	4–14	Leeds Rhinos	29 August 2021, 17:00	LNER Community Stadium

=== Round 3 ===
Home	Score	Away	Match Information
Home	Score	Away	Date and Time	Venue	Referee
Leeds Rhinos	0–24	St Helens	—N/a (Note: Leeds forfeited fixture after announcing they could not raise a team for the match.)
Wigan Warriors	6–20	York City Knights	Robin Park, Wigan	5 September 2021, 15:00

=== Round 4 ===
Home	Score	Away	Match Information
Home	Score	Away	Date and Time	Venue	Referee
Castleford Tigers	6–50	St Helens	12 September 2021, 14:00	Mend-A-Hose Jungle
Leeds Rhinos	28–10	Wigan Warriors	12 September 2021, 14:00	Sport Park, Weetwood

=== Round 5 ===
Home	Score	Away	Match Information
Home	Score	Away	Date and Time	Venue	Referee
St Helens	52–0	Wigan Warriors	19 September 2021, 14:00	Totally Wicked Stadium
York City Knights	28–14	Castleford Tigers	19 September 2021, 17:00	LNER Community Stadium

=== Play-off semi-finals ===
Home	Score	Away	Match Information
Home	Score	Away	Date and Time	Venue	Referee
St Helens	58–0	Castleford Tigers	26 September 2021, 13:15	Totally Wicked Stadium	J. Smith
Leeds Rhinos	22–18	York City Knights	26 September 2021, 15:30	Totally Wicked Stadium	A. Moore

== Grand final ==
10 October 2021
15:00

St Helens	28 – 0	Leeds Rhinos
Tries: Burke (2), Cunningham, Hardcastle, Harris, Bush; Goals: Stott (2/6)

Emerald Headingley
Attendance: 4,235
Referee: Aaron Moore
Player of the Match: Chantelle Crowl (St Helens)

St Helens	Position	Leeds Rhinos
#24 Rachael Woosey	Fullback	#1 Caitlin Beevers
#21 Danielle Bush 73'	Wing	#17 Tasha Gaines
#4 Amy Hardcastle 59'	Centre	#5 Fran Goldthorp
#20 Carrie Roberts	Centre	#3 Sophie Robinson
#5 Leah Burke 21', 57'	Wing	#13 Sophie Nuttall (substituted off) 33'
#15 Beth Stott	Stand-off	#6 Hanna Butcher
#6 Zoe Harris 67'	Scrum-half	#7 Courtney Winfield-Hill
#26 Isabelle Rudge	Prop	#11 Aimee Stavley
#9 Tara Jones	Hooker	#9 Keara Bennett
#13 Chantelle Crowl	Prop	#25 Zoe Hornby
#12 Emily Rudge	Second-row	#4 Chloe Kerrigan
#3 Naomi Williams	Second-row	#12 Elle Frain
#1 Jodie Cunningham 40' (yellow card) 10'	Loose forward	#23 Orla McCallion
#2 Rebecca Rotheram	interchange	#18 Sam Hulme
#8 Vicky Whitfield	interchange	#20 Lucy Murray
#11 Philippa Birchall	interchange	#15 Danika Priim
#19 Paige Travis	interchange	#26 Beth Lockwood

== Women's Super League shield ==
=== Round 1 ===
Home	Score	Away	Match Information
Home	Score	Away	Date and Time	Venue	Referee
Wakefield Trinity	0–52	Featherstone Rovers	8 August 2021, 12:00	The Mobile Rocket Stadium, Wakefield
Warrington Wolves	26–28	Huddersfield Giants	8 August 2021, 14:00	Asics Stadium, Warrington

=== Round 2 ===
Home	Score	Away	Match Information
Home	Score	Away	Date and Time	Venue	Referee
Huddersfield Giants	32–10	Bradford Bulls	15 August 2021, 14:00	Lockwood Park, Huddersfield
Wakefield Trinity	0–76	Warrington Wolves	15 August 2021, 14:00	Asics Stadium, Warrington

=== Round 3 ===
Home	Score	Away	Match Information
Home	Score	Away	Date and Time	Venue	Referee
Bradford Bulls	6–24	Warrington Wolves	22 August 2021, 14:00	Odsal Stadium, Bradford
Featherstone Rovers	16–14	Huddersfield Giants	22 August 2021, 14:00	Millennium Stadium, Featherstone

=== Round 4 ===
Home	Score	Away	Match Information
Home	Score	Away	Date and Time	Venue	Referee
Huddersfield Giants	78–0	Wakefield Trinity	5 September 2021, 12:00	The Mobile Rocket Stadium, Wakefield
Featherstone Rovers	28–4	Bradford Bulls	5 September 2021, 14:00	Millennium Stadium, Featherstone

=== Round 5 ===
Home	Score	Away	Match Information
Home	Score	Away	Date and Time	Venue	Referee
Bradford Bulls	46–6	Wakefield Trinity	14 September 2021, 19:45	Odsal Stadium, Bradford
Warrington Wolves	18–34	Featherstone Rovers	12 September 2021, 15:00	Asics Stadium, Warrington

=== Semi-finals ===
Home	Score	Away	Match Information
Home	Score	Away	Date and Time	Venue	Referee
Featherstone Rovers	30–12	Bradford Bulls	21 September 2021, 13:00	Millennium Stadium, Featherstone	M. Smaill
Huddersfield Giants	30–26 (Note: After golden point extra time)	Warrington Wolves	12 September 2021, 15:00	Laund Hill, Huddersfield

=== Shield final ===
10 October 2021
13:00

Featherstone Rovers	22 – 24	Huddersfield Giants
Tries: Billington, Grace, Churm (2); Goals: Hepworth (3)	report	Tries: Townend, Campbell, Brown (2); Goals: Townend (4)

Emerald Headingley
Attendance: 4,235
Referee: Nick Bennett

Featherstone Rovers	Position	Huddersfield Giants
#6 Katie Hepworth	Fullback	#1 Philippa Curley
#18 Chloe Billingon	Wing	#5 Amelia Brown
#3 Brogan Kennedy	Centre	#4 Erin Stott
#31 Gabrielle Harrison	Centre	#25 Ellie Thompson
#30 Fran Copley	Wing	#2 Annabel Loney
#13 Andrea Dobson	Stand-off	#27 Fran Townend
#27 Olivia Grace	Scrum-half	#6 Sade Rihari
#10 Brogan Churm	Prop	#26 Charlotte Hawkins
#14 Charley Blackburn	Hooker	#14 Isabella Sykes
#8 Zoe Teece	Prop	#19 Jamie-Leigh Bellerby
#11 Jessica Hammond	Second-row	#24 Olivia Rowe
#1 Hannah Watt	Second-row	#17 Isabel Northrop
#23 Shanelle Mannion	Loose forward	#11 Emma Wilkinson
#22 Cairo Newby	interchange	#9 Bethan Oates
#16 Jasmine Hazell	interchange	#16 Bridget Campbell
#26 Matilda Butler	interchange	#13 Chloe Fairbank
#20 Grace Dyke	interchange	#10 Rachel Barker
