= 2016 Women's Challenge Cup =

Women's rugby league competition

- Duration: 4 rounds
- Number of teams: 13
- Winners: Thatto Heath St Helens
- Runners-up: Leigh Miners Rangers
- Biggest home win: Leigh Miners Rangers 58 – 0 Brighouse Rangers
- Biggest away win: Normanton Knights 4 – 62 Thatto Heath St Helens

The 2016 RFL Women's Challenge Cup was an English rugby league knockout tournament competed for by 12 teams during the summer of 2016. The Challenge Cup was won by Thatto Heath St Helens who beat Leigh Miners Rangers 6–62 in the final. The Challenge Shield was won by the Thatto Heath Reserves team who beat Whitley Bay Barbarians 0–44 in the final. Both finals took place on 31 July 2016 at the Provident Stadium, Bradford.

== Round One ==
The first round took place on 8 May:

| Home | Score | Away |
|---|---|---|
| Leigh Miners Rangers | 58–0 | Brighouse Rangers |
| Normanton Knights | 4–62 | Thatto Heath St Helens |
| Rochdale Hornets | v | Oulton Raidettes |
| Selby Warriors | 16–22 | Army |
| Stanningley | 6–58 | Bradford Bulls |
| Featherstone Rovers | – | Bye |
| Lindley Swifts | – | Bye |
| Wigan St Patricks | – | Bye |

== Quarter Finals ==
The quarter finals took place on 12 June:

| Home | Score | Away |
|---|---|---|
| Featherstone Rovers | 10–36 | Thatto Heath St Helens |
| Oulton Raidettes | 4–48 | Bradford Bulls |
| Wigan St Patricks | 6–22 | Leigh Miners Rangers |
| Lindley Swifts | P–P | Army |

== Semi-Finals ==
The semi-finals were played on 13 July and 17 July:

| Home | Score | Away |
|---|---|---|
| Bradford Bulls | 16–20 | Thatto Heath St Helens |
| Leigh Miners Rangers | 16–14 | Army |

== Final ==
The final took place on 31 July at Provident Stadium in Bradford. Thatto Heath were reigning champions having won the cup in 2013, 2014 and 2015. It was a first Challenge Cup Final appearance for Leigh Miners Rangers who had won the Plate final at the 2015 Grand Finals day. The score was Leigh Miners Rangers 6–62 Thatto Heath. Tara-Jane Stanley scored four tries and kicked seven goals to set a record as the highest scoring player in the Women's Challenge Cup final with 30 points.

31 July 2016
3:00 pm BST

| Leigh Miners Rangers | 6 – 62 | Thatto Heath St Helens |
|---|---|---|
| Tries: Georgia Sutherland; Goals: Emily Mullen | report | Tries: Roxy Mura, Tara-Jane Stanley (4), Jenny Welsby, Jodie Cunningham (2), Sammie Simpson (2), Emily Rudge (2); Goals: Tara Jane Stanley (7) |

Provident Stadium, Bradford
Referee: Neil Pascall
Player of the Match: Tara Jane Stanley

== Challenge Shield ==
The Challenge Shield was competed for by the teams that lost in the first round of the cup and additional teams from the Merit League.

=== Shield Round One ===
The first round took place on 12 June:

| Home | Score | Away |
|---|---|---|
| Selby Warriors | 24–0 | West Leeds Eagles |
| West Craven Warriors | 0–24 | Normanton Knights |
| Whitley Bay Barbarians | 38–0 | Brighouse Rangers |
| Thatto Heath St Helens Reserves | P–P | Stanningley |

=== Shield Semi-Finals ===
Selby Warriors withdrew from the competition resulting in a walkover for Whitley Bay Barbarians. The other semi-final was played on 17 July:

| Home | Score | Away |
|---|---|---|
| Normanton Knights | 8–34 | Thatto Heath St Helens Reserves |
| Whitley Bay Barbarians | – | Bye |

=== Shield Final ===
The final of the Shield took place on 31 July at Provident Stadium, Bradford, before the Challenge Cup final. The score was Whitley Bay Barbarians 0–44 Thatto Heath. Several of the Thatto Heath players were also named in the team for the cup final.

31 July 2016
1:00 pm BST

| Whitley Bay Barbarians | 0 – 44 | Thatto Heath St Helens Reserves |
|---|---|---|
| | report | Tries: Lydia Binstead, Rebecca Rotheram (2), Jade Ward, Danni Bound (3), Naomi Williams, Alisha Lea; Goals: Taleah Backo (4) |

Provident Stadium, Bradford
Player of the Match: Kath Organ
