= 2024 RFL Women's Super League results =

The fixture list for the 2024 Women's Super League was issued on 24 January 2024. The regular season comprises 14 rounds of matches starting on 19 April and ending on 15 September.

== Regular season ==
All times are UK local time (UTC+01:00)

=== Round 1 ===
Betfred Women's Super League: round one
Home	Score	Away	Match Information
Home	Score	Away	Date and Time	Venue
Leeds Rhinos	66–4	Huddersfield Giants	19 April 2024, 17:30	Headingley Stadium
Wigan Warriors	18–4	Barrow Raiders	19 April 2024, 17:30	DW Stadium
Warrington Wolves	34–28	Featherstone Rovers	21 April 2024, 12:00	Victoria Park
York Valkyrie	20–16	St Helens	21 April 2024, 12:00	York Community Stadium

=== Round 2 ===
Betfred Women's Super League: round two
Home	Score	Away	Match Information
Home	Score	Away	Date and Time	Venue
Leeds Rhinos	68–0	Warrington Wolves	27 April 2024, 12:00	Headingley Stadium
Barrow Raiders	8–28	York Valkyrie	27 April 2024, 14:00	Craven Park
Wigan Warriors	54–12	Featherstone Rovers	28 April 2024, 12:00	Robin Park Arena
St Helens	60–6	Huddersfield Giants	28 April 2024, 14:00	Totally Wicked Stadium

=== Round 3 ===
Betfred Women's Super League: round three
Home	Score	Away	Match Information
Home	Score	Away	Date and Time	Venue
Huddersfield Giants	0–102	Wigan Warriors	11 May 2024, 12:00	John Smiths Stadium
Featherstone Rovers	4–58	St Helens	11 May 2024, 14:00	Post Office Road
Warrington Wolves	10–6	Barrow Raiders	12 May 2024, 12:00	Victoria Park
York Valkyrie	10–16	Leeds Rhinos	12 May 2024, 12:00	York Community Stadium

=== Round 4 ===
Betfred Women's Super League: round four
Home	Score	Away	Match Information
Home	Score	Away	Date and Time	Venue
St Helens	12–6	Leeds Rhinos	24 May 2024, 17:30	Totally Wicked Stadium
Warrington Wolves	4–48	Wigan Warriors	25 May 2024, 13:00	Halliwell Jones Stadium
Barrow Raiders	22–10	Featherstone Rovers	26 May 2024, 12:00	Craven Park
Huddersfield Giants	12–50	York Valkyrie	26 May 2024, 14:00	Laund Hill

=== Round 5 ===
Betfred Women's Super League: round five
Home	Score	Away	Match Information
Home	Score	Away	Date and Time	Venue
St Helens	24–8	Wigan Warriors	31 May 2024, 17:15	Totally Wicked Stadium
Featherstone Rovers	10–30	Huddersfield Giants	1 June 2024, 12:00	Post Office Road
Leeds Rhinos	68–0	Barrow Raiders	1 June 2024, 14:45	Headingley Stadium
York Valkyrie	44–4	Warrington Wolves	2 June 2024, 12:00	York Community Stadium

=== Round 6 ===
Betfred Women's Super League: round six
Home	Score	Away	Match Information
Home	Score	Away	Date and Time	Venue
Barrow Raiders	6–46	Wigan Warriors	15 June 2024, 13:30	Craven Park
Featherstone Rovers	10–16	Warrington Wolves	15 June 2024, 14:00	Post Office Road
Huddersfield Giants	4–42	Leeds Rhinos	16 June 2024, 14:00	Laund Hill
St Helens	10–6	York Valkyrie	31 July 2024, 19:30	Totally Wicked Stadium

=== Round 7 ===
Betfred Women's Super League: round seven
Home	Score	Away	Match Information
Home	Score	Away	Date and Time	Venue
Leeds Rhinos	6–16	St Helens	6 July 2024, 12:30	Headingley Stadium
Featherstone Rovers	0–50	Wigan Warriors	6 July 2024, 13:00	Post Office Road
Warrington Wolves	10–32	Huddersfield Giants	7 July 2024, 12:00	Victoria Park
York Valkyrie	44–0	Barrow Raiders	7 July 2024, 12:00	York Community Stadium

=== Round 8 ===
Betfred Women's Super League: round eight
Home	Score	Away	Match Information
Home	Score	Away	Date and Time	Venue
Wigan Warriors	12–16	St Helens	12 July 2024, 17:30	Brick Community Stadium
Warrington Wolves	4–50	Leeds Rhinos	14 July 2024, 12:00	Victoria Park
York Valkyrie	62–0	Featherstone Rovers	14 July 2024, 12:00	York Community Stadium
Huddersfield Giants	14–26	Barrow Raiders	14 July 2024, 14:00	Laund Hill

=== Round 9 ===
Betfred Women's Super League: round nine
Home	Score	Away	Match Information
Home	Score	Away	Date and Time	Venue
St Helens	82–0	Warrington Wolves	20 July 2024, 14:00	Totally Wicked Stadium
York Valkyrie	10–18	Wigan Warriors	21 July 2024, 12:00	York Community Stadium
Barrow Raiders	10–28	Leeds Rhinos	21 July 2024, 12:00	Craven Park
Huddersfield Giants	44–8	Featherstone Rovers	21 July 2024, 14:00	Laund Hill

=== Round 10 ===
Betfred Women's Super League: round ten
Home	Score	Away	Match Information
Home	Score	Away	Date and Time	Venue
Barrow Raiders	6–64	St Helens	4 August 2024, 12:00	Craven Park
Featherstone Rovers	6–68	Leeds Rhinos	4 August 2024, 12:00	Post Office Road
Warrington Wolves	0–61	York Valkyrie	4 August 2024, 12:00	Victoria Park
Wigan Warriors	70–0	Huddersfield Giants	4 August 2024, 12:00	Heywood Road

=== Round 11 ===
Betfred Women's Super League: round eleven
Home	Score	Away	Match Information
Home	Score	Away	Date and Time	Venue
Leeds Rhinos	28–8	Wigan Warriors	9 August 2024, 17:30	Headingley Stadium
St Helens	56–6	Featherstone Rovers	10 August 2024, 12:00	Totally Wicked Stadium
Barrow Raiders	32–14	Warrington Wolves	10 August 2024, 14:00	Craven Park
York Valkyrie	48–10	Huddersfield Giants	11 August 2024, 12:00	York Community Stadium

=== Round 12 ===
Betfred Women's Super League: round twelve
Home	Score	Away	Match Information
Home	Score	Away	Date and Time	Venue
Featherstone Rovers	16–28	Barrow Raiders	1 September 2024, 12:00	Post Office Road
Huddersfield Giants	8–40	St Helens	1 September 2024, 12:00	Laund Hill
Leeds Rhinos	6–32	York Valkyrie	1 September 2024, 12:00	Headingley Stadium
Wigan Warriors	82–0	Warrington Wolves	1 September 2024, 12:00	Robin Park Arena

=== Round 13 ===
Betfred Women's Super League: round thirteen
Home	Score	Away	Match Information
Home	Score	Away	Date and Time	Venue
Warrington Wolves	0–98	St Helens	7 September 2024, 12:00	Victoria Park
Leeds Rhinos	52–12	Featherstone Rovers	8 September 2024, 12:00	Headingley Stadium
Barrow Raiders	24–4	Huddersfield Giants	8 September 2024, 14:00	Craven Park
Wigan Warriors	12–16	York Valkyrie	8 September 2024, 14:30	Sutton Park, Leigh

=== Round 14 ===
Betfred Women's Super League: round fourteen
Home	Score	Away	Match Information
Home	Score	Away	Date and Time	Venue
St Helens	68–0	Barrow Raiders	13 September 2024, 17:15	Totally Wicked Stadium
Wigan Warriors	4–24	Leeds Rhinos	13 September 2024, 17:30	Brick Community Stadium
Featherstone Rovers	6–32	York Valkyrie	15 September 2024, 12:00	Post Office Road
Huddersfield Giants	36–0	Warrington Wolves	15 September 2024, 14:00	Laund Hill

== Play-offs ==
=== Semi-finals ===
Home	Score	Away	Match Information
Home	Score	Away	Date and Time	Venue
Leeds Rhinos	10–12	York Valkyrie	22 September 2024, 17:00	Headingley Stadium
St Helens	18–4	Wigan Warriors	22 September 2022, 19:30	Totally Wicked Stadium

=== Grand final ===
6 October 2024
16:30 BST (UTC+01:00)

St Helens	8–18	York Valkyrie
Tries: Burke 10'; Goals: Gaskin 35, 39'	Report	Tries: Owen 15'; Partington 43' Gentles 55'; Goals: Brennan 16; Marshall 44', 56'

Totally Wicked Stadium
Attendance: 4,813
Referee: Liam Rush
Player of the Match: Georgie Hetherington (York)

Team details
St Helens		Position	York Valkyrie
Name	Number	Position	Number	Name
Beri Salihi	1	FB	5	Georgie Hetherington
Phoebe Hook	20	WG	26	Carrie Roberts
Erin Stott	4	CE	23	Manuqalo Komaitai
Rachel Woosey	30	CE	36	Lisa Parker
Leah Burke 10'	5	WG	2	Ebony Partington
Zoe Harris	6	SO	6	Sade Rihari
Faye Gaskin	7	SH	3	Tamzin Renouf
Vicky Whitfield (substituted off) 27' (substituted on) 61'	8	PR	8	Olivia Wood
Tara Jones (substituted off) 22' (substituted on) 67'	9	HK	29	Izzy Brennan
Chantelle Crowl (substituted off) 30' (substituted on) 61'	10	PF	10	Jasmine Bell
Emily Rudge	12	SR	11	Lacey Owen
Paige Travis	11	SR	12	Savannah Andrade
Jodie Cunningham	13	LF	33	Megan Pakulis
Naomi Williams (substituted on) 30' (substituted off) 61'	14	IN	13	Rhiannon Marshall
Darcy Stott (substituted on) 27' (substituted off) 52'	16	IN	15	Kelsey Gentles
Katie Mottershead (substituted on) 22' (substituted off) 67'	19	IN	18	Jess Sharp
Megan Williams (substituted on) 52' (substituted off) 61'	22	IN	28	Remi Wilton
Matty Smith		Coach		Lindsay Anfield
