= 2013 Women's Challenge Cup =

Women's rugby league competition

- Winners: Thatto Heath
- Runners-up: Bradford Thunderbirds
- Biggest home win: Stanningley 56 – 0 Hunslet Hawks
- Biggest away win: Stanningley 0 – 94 Bradford Thunderbirds

The 2013 Women's Challenge Cup was an English rugby league knockout tournament competed for during the summer of 2013. This was the second staging of the Challenge Cup and it was won by Thatto Heath who beat Bradford Thunderbirds 54–12 in the final. The Challenge Shield was won by Normanton Knights who beat Featherstone Rovers 34–16 in the final. Both finals took place on 23 June 2013 at The LoveRugbyLeague.Com Stadium, Batley.

== Round One ==
The first round was played on 14 April:

- Brighouse 8 – 40 Wigan St Patricks
- Chorley Panthers 8 – 20 Leigh Miners Rangers
- Stanningley 56 – 0 Hunslet Hawks

== Round Two ==
The second round was played on 28 April:

- Bradford Thunderbirds 24 – 0 Leigh East
- Crosfields 32 – 22 Featherstone Rovers
- Leigh Miners Rangers 18 – 30 Coventry Bears
- Normanton Knights 0 – 28 Thatto Heath
- Oulton Raidettes 4 – 12 Whinmoor Warriors
- Southampton Spitfires 24 – 0 Leyland Warriors
- Wigan St Patricks 4 – 24 Castleford Panthers
- Stanningley - Bye

== Round Three ==
The third round was played on 21 May, 26 May and 2 June:

- Castleford Panthers 12 – 54 Bradford Thunderbirds
- Crosfields 24 – 0 Coventry Bears
- Stanningley 22 – 12 Whinmoor Warriors
- Thatto Heath 24 – 0 Southampton Spitfires

== Semi Finals ==
The semi-finals were played on 9 June:

- Stanningley 0 – 94 Bradford Thunderbirds
- Thatto Heath 56 – 6 Crosfields

== Final ==
The final was played on 23 June 2013 at The LoveRugbyLeague.Com Stadium, Batley. The score was Bradford Thunderbirds 12–54 Thatto Heath. Claire McGinnis scored four tries for Thatto Heath and Amy Smith kicked seven goals. Following their success the Thatto Heath team were given a civic reception at St Helens Town Hall.

== Challenge Shield ==
=== Shield Round One ===
The first round was played on 26 May and 2 June:

- Featherstone Rovers 24 – 0 Chorley Panthers
- Hunslet Hawks 40 – 10 Oulton Raidettes
- Leigh Miners Rangers 28 – 18 Brighouse
- Normanton Knights 24 – 0 Wigan St Patricks

=== Shield Semi Final ===
The semi-finals were played on 9 June:

- Leigh Miners Rangers 8 – 22 Featherstone Rovers
- Normanton Knights 74 – 4 Hunslet Hawks

=== Shield Final ===
The shield final was played on 23 June 2013 at The LoveRugbyLeague.Com Stadium, Batley. The score was Featherstone Rovers 16–34 Normanton Knights.
