= 2019 Challenge Cup =

Rugby league competition

- Duration: 9 Rounds
- Number of teams: 87
- Highest attendance: 62,717; (Final)
- Lowest attendance: 92; West Hull v Dewsbury Moor (10 March 2019)
- Aggregate attendance: 60,246 (est)
- Broadcast partners: BBC Sport; Sky Sports; Fox League
- Winners: Warrington Wolves
- Runners-up: St. Helens
- Biggest home win: Oldham 80–10 Haydock (10 March 2019)
- Biggest away win: Oldham 14–54 Widnes Vikings (31 March 2019)
- Lance Todd Trophy: Daryl Clark; Warrington Wolves

The 2019 Challenge Cup known as the Coral Challenge Cup for sponsorship reasons, is the 118th staging of the Challenge Cup, the main rugby league knockout tournament for teams in the Super League, the British National Leagues and a number of invited amateur clubs.

The defending champions were Catalans Dragons, who beat Warrington Wolves 20–14 at Wembley Stadium on 25 August 2018, to become the first non-British team to win the challenge cup in its 117-year history. However, they were eliminated in the quarter-finals after a 51–8 defeat, away to Hull F.C.

The format of the competition will be eight knock-out rounds followed by the final. The final will be held on the August bank holiday weekend, and from 2020 the final will move to July, but will still be played at Wembley Stadium. The day of the final will see three matches played back-to-back, with the Challenge Cup final being preceded by the Steven Mullaney Memorial Match (the RFL Champion Schools Final for Year 7s), and the final of the newly announced 1895 Cup for clubs in the Championship and League 1.

A new sponsorship deal was announced in January 2019, with Coral replacing Ladbrokes (although both are part of the Ladbrokes Coral group).

== Round details ==
Round	Date	Clubs involved this round	Winners from previous round	New entries this round	Leagues entering at this round
Round 1	26–27 January	52	n/a	52	44 English amateur clubs; Scottish, Welsh & Irish champions; 3 Armed Forces teams; British Police; Serbian champions
Round 2	9–10 February	26	26	n/a	—N/a
Round 3	9–10 March	24	13	11	League 1
Round 4	30–31 March	24	12	12*	Championship
Round 5	13–14 April	16	12	4	2018 Super League Qualifiers top 4
Round 6	9–12 May	16	8	8	2018 Super League top 8
Quarter-finals	1–2 June	8	8	n/a	—N/a
Semi-finals	27 July	4	4	n/a	—N/a
Final	24 August	2	2	n/a	—N/a

*Toulouse Olympique and Toronto Wolfpack declined to participate in the competition.

== Entry ==
Entry into the Cup is mandatory for the English and Welsh professional teams, but is by invitation for all other clubs, either professional or amateur. French side Toulouse declined to enter for 2019, after also declining to play in the 2018 competition. Canadian side Toronto Wolfpack also declined to enter for 2019, after both clubs were presented with a demand by the Rugby Football League (RFL) for roughly £750,000 (€830,000; C$1,226,000 approximately) as a bond insurance against reduced ticket sales, if either team reached the final.

In January 2019 it was revealed that defending champions, Catalans Dragons, had also been asked to pay a £500,000 (€553,000) bond to enter the competition. Catalans informed the RFL, that the club had no intention of paying, leading to the possibility, that for the first time ever, the competition would take place without the defending champions being in the tournament. However, after settling their dispute with the RFL, it was confirmed that they would be defending their title.

The first and second rounds of the competition are competed for solely by amateur teams, and for 2019, 51 British based teams are joined by Serbian side Red Star in the draw for the first round of the cup. Red Star's entry is on condition that they play away from home in the first and second rounds (assuming victory in the first round). The 51 amateur clubs are 47 British teams together with four teams representing the armed forces and the British police. This season will be the first since the 1990s, that no student sides will be playing in the competition.

== First round ==
The draw was made on 14 December 2018 at Headingley Rugby Stadium and was streamed live on the BBC Sport website. The home teams were drawn by Leeds Rhinos Women captain Lois Forsell and the away teams by Bradford Bulls coach John Kear. Ties are to be played over the weekend of 26/27 January 2019.

Home	Score	Away	Match Information
Home	Score	Away	Date and Time	Venue	Referee	Attendance (Note: Attendances for games involving only community clubs are not recorded)
Bentley RLFC	18–16	British Army	26 January 2019, 14:00	Scawthorpe Social Club	J. Stearne
Bradford Dudley Hill	0–16	Milford	26 January 2019, 14:00	Neil Hunt Memorial Ground	A. Moore
Clock Face Miners	0–24	Siddal	26 January 2019, 14:00	Clock Face Miners Recreation Club	C. Etchells
Dewsbury Moor	24–10	Skirlaugh	26 January 2019, 14:00	Heckmondwike Road	T. Arnold
Distington	48–0	Torfaen Tigers	26 January 2019, 14:00	Grass Rpoad	L. Rush
Drighlington	32–4	All Golds	26 January 2019, 14:00	Wakefield Road	D. Arnold
East Leeds	24–10	Batley Boys	26 January 2019, 14:00	Richmond Hill	A. Billington
Hunslet Club Parkside	16–30	Thornhill Trojans	26 January 2019, 14:00	Hillidge Road	G. Houston
Hunslet Warriors	16–28	Featherstone Lions	26 January 2019, 14:00	The Oval	K. Moore
Kells	4–14	Rochdale Mayfield	26 January 2019, 14:00	Old Arrowthwaite	A. Sweet
London Chargers	6–34	Wath Brow Hornets	26 January 2019, 14:00	Clapham Common	L. Staveley
Normanton Knights	50–16	Edinburgh Eagles	26 January 2019, 14:00	Queen Elizabeth Drive	J. Jones
Orrell St James	12–30	Underbank Rangers	26 January 2019, 14:00	Bankes Avenue	T. Jones
Ovenden	22–20	Woolston Rovers	26 January 2019, 14:00	Four Fields	H. Neville
Royal Navy	12–42	West Hull	26 January 2019, 14:00	US Sports Ground	S. Race
Shaw Cross Sharks	18–28	Haydock	26 January 2019, 14:00	Leeds Road	J Seymour
Thatto Heath Crusaders	32–6	Stanningley	26 January 2019, 14:00	Hattons Solicitors Crusader Park	E. McCarthy
West Bowling	42–12	Hammersmith Hills Hoists	26 January 2019, 14:00	Emsley Recreation Ground	J. Butterfield
Wigan St Judes	15–14	Crosfields	26 January 2019, 14:00	Keats Avenue	N. Woodward
York Acorn	42–4	Beverley	26 January 2019, 14:00	Thanet Road	P. Parker
Leigh East	12–24	Wigan St Patricks	26 January 2019, 14:30	Leigh Sports Village	S. Chromiak
Leigh Miners Rangers	22–10	Oulton Raiders	26 January 2019, 14:30	Twist Lane	R. Dolan
Wallsend Eagles	18–44	British Police	26 January 2019, 14:30	Benfield Sports Centre	S. Ellis
North Herts Crusaders	6–22	Royal Air Force	27 January 2019, 13:00	King George V field, Hitchin	C. Astbury
Lock Lane	16–10	Longhorns	27 January 2019, 13:30	Hicksons Arena	T. Crashley
Millom	38–10	Red Star Belgrade	27 January 2019, 13:30	Coronation Field	B. Milligan

== Second round ==
The draw was made on 28 January 2019 at Wigan St Patricks and was streamed live on the BBC Sport website. The home teams were drawn by Leigh Centurions captain Mickey Higham and the away teams by Wigan Warriors halfback George Williams. Ties are to be played over the weekend of 9–10 February 2019.

Home	Score	Away	Match Information
Home	Score	Away	Date and Time	Venue	Referee	Attendance
Distington	14–6	Royal Air Force	9 February 2019, 14:00	Grass Road	D. Arnold
Drighlington	16–20	Wigan St Judes	9 February 2019, 14:00	Wakefield Road	S. Chromiak
East Leeds	16–20	Dewsbury Moor	9 February 2019, 14:00	Richmond Hill	A. Gill
Milford	22–28	Lock Lane	9 February 2019, 14:00	Milford Sports Club	A. Moore
Millom	0–26	Siddal	9 February 2019, 14:00	Coronation Field	A. Billington
Normanton Knights	22–32	Haydock	9 February 2019, 14:00	Queen Elizabeth Drive	P. Parker
Ovenden	18–38	West Bowling	9 February 2019, 14:00	Four Fields	T. Arnold
Thatto Heath Crusaders	36–6	Leigh Miners Rangers	9 February 2019, 14:00	Close Street	N. Horton
Thornhill Trojans	20–30	Rochdale Mayfield	9 February 2019, 14:00	Overthorpe Park	J. Jones
Underbank Rangers	26–30	Featherstone Lions	9 February 2019, 14:00	Dunford Road	E. McCarthy
Wath Brow Hornets	8–9	York Acorn	9 February 2019, 14:00	Trumpet Road	C. Etchells
West Hull	36–0	Bentley	9 February 2019, 14:00	West Hull Community Park	J. Turner
Wigan St Patricks	28–20	British Police	10 February 2019, 14:30	Clarington Park	T. Jones

== Third round ==
The draw for the third round was made at St Mary's Guildhall, Coventry on 11 February and shown live on the BBC Sport website. The draw was made by Coventry born athletes Kare Adenegan and David Moorcroft. During the draw ball number six (Haydock) was announced wrongly as number nine (Lock Lane) and vice versa. The RFL later confirmed that the draw would be as the balls drawn and not as they were announced.

Home	Score	Away	Match Information
Home	Score	Away	Date and Time	Venue	Referee	Attendance
Doncaster	38–16	Coventry Bears	8 March 2019, 19:45	Keepmoat Stadium	N. Bennett	381
Thatto Heath Crusaders	30–24	Rochdale Mayfield	9 March 2019, 14:00	Close Street	P. Marklove	350 (est)
Wigan St Judes	4–24	Lock Lane	9 March 2019, 14:00	Keats Avenue	C. Smith	300 (est)
York Acorn	10–20	Featherstone Lions	9 March 2019, 14:00	Thanet Road	J. Stearne	385
Newcastle Thunder	48–0	West Wales Raiders	9 March 2019, 14:30	Kingston Park	L. Staveley	329
Hunslet	56–10	West Bowling	9 March 2019, 15:00	South Leeds Stadium	M. Smaill	399
London Skolars	18–31	North Wales Crusaders	10 March 2019, 14:00	New River Stadium	B. Pearson	170
West Hull	26–10	Dewsbury Moor	10 March 2019, 14:30	West Hull Community Park	A. Sweet	92
Keighley Cougars	28–14	Distington	10 March 2019, 15:00	Cougar Park	S. Race	508
Oldham	80–10	Haydock	10 March 2019, 15:00	Vestacare Stadium	A. Moore	508
Whitehaven	74–4	Wigan St Patricks	10 March 2019, 15:00	Recreation Ground	C. Worsley	464
Workington Town	22–0	Siddal	17 March 2019, 15:00 (Note: Game was postponed on 10 March due to unplayable pitch)	Derwent Park	B. Pearson	355

== Fourth round ==
The draw for the fourth round was made at Odsal Stadium, home of the Bradford Bulls on 12 March and shown live on the BBC Sport website. The draw was made by former Bradford player Robbie Hunter-Paul and Simon Foster, son of former player Trevor Foster.

Home	Score	Away	Match Information
Home	Score	Away	Date and Time	Venue	Referee	Attendance
Featherstone Rovers	38–14	Swinton Lions	30 March 2019, 14:00	LD Nutrition Stadium	L. Moore	691
Thatto Heath Crusaders	16–14	North Wales Crusaders	30 March 2019, 14:30	Crusader Park	J. McMullen	737
Featherstone Lions	6–46	Doncaster	31 March 2019, 14:00	LD Nutrition Stadium	A. Sweet	not recorded
Keighley Cougars	12–14	Bradford Bulls	31 March 2019, 14:45	Cougar Park	M. Griffiths	1,881
Barrow Raiders	16–32	York City Knights	31 March 2019, 15:00	Craven Park	G. Hewer	898
Batley Bulldogs	62–6	Lock Lane	31 March 2019, 15:00	The Fox's Biscuit Stadium	N. Bennett	501
Dewsbury Rams	32–6	West Hull	31 March 2019, 15:00	Tetley's Stadium	C. Worsley	366
Hunslet	24–28	Halifax	31 March 2019, 15:00	South Leeds Stadium	B. Pearson	731
Oldham	14–54	Widnes Vikings	31 March 2019, 15:00	Bower Fold	J. Smith	1,247
Sheffield Eagles	12–34	Leigh Centurions	31 March 2019, 15:00	Olympic Legacy Park	G. Dolan	596
Whitehaven	21–22	Rochdale Hornets	31 March 2019, 15:00	Recreation Ground	M. Rossleigh	889
Workington Town	21–20	Newcastle Thunder	31 March 2019, 15:00	Derwent Park	T. Crashley	590

== Fifth round ==
The fifth round ties were drawn on 1 April and shown live on BBC Sport. The home teams were drawn by Linzi Prescott (widow of Steve Prescott) and the away teams by Martin Offiah. Ties will be played over the weekend of 11–14 April.

Home	Score	Away	Match Information
Home	Score	Away	Date and Time	Venue	Referee	Attendance
Halifax	24–16	London Broncos	11 April 2019, 19:30	The Shay	T. Grant	722
Hull Kingston Rovers	14–10	Leigh Centurions	11 April 2019, 19:30	KCOM Craven Park	L. Moore	2,188
Leeds Rhinos	78–6	Workington Town	12 April 2019, 19:45	Emerald Headingley	M. Griffiths	4,197
Salford Red Devils	76–6	Rochdale Hornets	12 April 2019, 19:45	AJ Bell Stadium	G. Dolan	1,101
Widnes Vikings	44–12	York City Knights	13 April 2019, 19:30	Select Security Stadium	J. Smith	2,229
Bradford Bulls	27–26 (Note: After golden point extra time)	Featherstone Rovers	14 April 2019, 15:00	Odsal Stadium	M.Rossleigh	1,691
Doncaster	16–12	Batley Bulldogs	14 April 2019, 15:00	Keepmoat Stadium	B. Pearson	539
Thatto Heath Crusaders	10–36	Dewsbury Rams	14 April 2019, 15:00	Crusader Park	C. Worsley	1,000 (est)

== Sixth round ==
The draw for the sixth round was made on 15 April 2019. Originally planned to be shown live on the BBC News Channel, the coverage was displaced due to ongoing coverage of the Notre-Dame de Paris fire and instead was restricted to live streaming on the BBC Sport website. The home teams were drawn by Paul Sculthorpe and the away teams by Jon Wilkin. Ties will be played over the weekend of 10–12 May.

Broadcasts of matches changed from on-line only to mainstream TV at this stage, with BBC and Sky Sports each televising two ties. BBC One will show the first competitive meeting of West Yorkshire rivals Bradford Bulls and Leeds Rhinos on Saturday 11 May. On Sunday 12 May, BBC One will show the repeat of the 2018 Super League Grand Final between Wigan Warriors and Warrington Wolves. Sky Sports will show two all-Super League ties; Hull F.C. v Castleford Tigers on Friday 10 May, and Huddersfield Giants v St. Helens on Sunday 12 May.

Home	Score	Away	Match Information
Home	Score	Away	Date and Time	Venue	Referee	Attendance
Hull F.C.	28–12	Castleford Tigers	10 May 2019, 19:35	KCOM Stadium	Robert Hicks	6,230
Wakefield Trinity	26–6	Widnes Vikings	10 May 2019, 19:45	The Mobile Rocket Stadium	Gareth Hewer	3,055
Dewsbury Rams	6–34	Halifax	10 May 2019, 20:00	Tetley's Stadium	Mark Griffiths	1,207
Salford Red Devils	18–32	Hull KR	11 May 2019, 14:00	AJ Bell Stadium	Chris Kendall	1,842
Bradford Bulls	24–22	Leeds Rhinos	11 May 2019, 14:30	Odsal Stadium	Ben Thaler	10,258
Catalans Dragons	62–6	Doncaster	11 May 2019, 15:00	Stade Gilbert Brutus	Liam Moore	3,466
Warrington Wolves	26–24	Wigan Warriors	12 May 2019, 14:15	Halliwell Jones Stadium	James Child	7,086
Huddersfield Giants	16–22	St. Helens	12 May 2019, 18:05	John Smiths Stadium	Scott Mikalauskus	3,533

== Quarter-finals ==
The draw for the quarter finals was made on 12 May live on BBC1, directly after the televised sixth-round tie between Wigan Warriors and Warrington Wolves, with Ellery Hanley and Jonathan Davies conducting the draw. The ties will be played 30 May – 2 June.

Home	Score	Away	Match Information
Home	Score	Away	Date and Time	Venue	Referee	Attendance
Hull F.C.	51–8	Catalans Dragons	30 May 2019, 19:35	KCOM Stadium	Ben Thaler	4,832
Hull KR	22–28	Warrington Wolves	31 May 2019, 19:35	KCOM Craven Park	Robert Hicks	3,311
St. Helens	48–10	Wakefield Trinity	1 June 2019, 15:15	Totally Wicked Stadium	Chris Kendall	6,453
Bradford Bulls	16–20	Halifax	2 June 2019, 14:45	Odsal Stadium	Scott Mikalauskus	6,591

== Semi-finals ==
Team A	Score	Team B	Match Information
Team A	Score	Team B	Date and Time	Venue	Referee	Attendance
Warrington Wolves	22–14	Hull F.C.	27 July 2019, 14:00	University of Bolton Stadium	Robert Hicks	24,364
St Helens	26–2	Halifax	27 July 2019, 16:30	University of Bolton Stadium	Chris Kendall	24,364

== Final ==
Team A	Score	Team B	Match Information
Team A	Score	Team B	Date and Time	Venue	Referee	Attendance
Warrington Wolves	18–4	St Helens	24 August 2019 15:00 (UTC+1)	Wembley Stadium	Robert Hicks	62,717

=== Teams ===
Warrington Wolves	Position	St Helens
1 Stefan Ratchford	Fullback	23 Lachlan Coote
2 Tom Lineham	Wing	2 Tommy Makinson
3 Bryson Goodwin	Centre	3 Kevin Naiqama
18 Toby King	Centre	4 Mark Percival
5 Josh Charnley	Wing	5 Regan Grace
11 Ben Currie	Stand-off	1 Jonny Lomax
15 Declan Patton	Scrum-half	6 Theo Fages
8 Chris Hill	Prop	8 Alex Walmsley
9 Daryl Clark	Hooker	9 James Roby
10 Mike Cooper	Prop	10 Luke Thompson
13 Ben Murdoch-Masila	Second-row	11 Zeb Taia
12 Jack Hughes	Second-row	17 Dominique Peyroux
14 Jason Clark	Loose forward	15 Morgan Knowles
19 Sitaleki Akauola	interchange	13 Louie McCarthy-Scarsbrook
17 Joe Philbin	interchange	16 Kyle Amor
23 Matthew Davis	interchange	20 Jack Ashworth
22 Jake Mamo	interchange	12 Joseph Paulo
Steve Price	Coach	Justin Holbrook

== Broadcasts ==
The primary broadcast organisation for the competition was BBC Sport. As in 2018 the BBC streamed one tie from each of the first five rounds live on the BBC Sport website with two games from the 6th, 7th, 8th rounds and the final being broadcast live on BBC TV.

Round	Match	Date	Broadcast method
1st	Orrell St James v Underbank Rangers	26 January 2019, 14:00	streamed live on OurLeague
1st	Royal Navy v West Hull	26 January 2019, 14:00	streamed live on British Forces Broadcasting
1st	Millom v Red Star Belgrade	27 January 2019, 13:30	streamed live on BBC Sport
2nd	Milford v Lock Lane	9 February 2019, 14:00	streamed live on BBC Sport
2nd	Wigan St Patricks v British Police	10 February 2019, 14:30	streamed live on OurLeague
3rd	Thatto Heath Crusaders v Rochdale Mayfield	9 March 2019, 14:00	streamed live on BBC Sport
3rd	Oldham v Haydock	10 March 2019, 15:00	streamed live on OurLeague (Note: Originally Workington Town v Siddal was to be streamed but the game was postponed.)
4th	Thatto Heath Crusaders v North Wales Crusaders	30 March 2019, 14:30	streamed live on OurLeague
4th	Keighley Cougars v Bradford Bulls	31 March 2019, 14:45	streamed live on BBC Sport and BBC Red Button
5th	Thatto Heath Crusaders v Dewsbury Rams	14 April 2019, 15:00	streamed live on BBC Sport
6th	Hull FC v Castleford Tigers	10 May 2019, 19:35	live Sky Sports
6th	Bradford Bulls v Leeds Rhinos	11 May 2019, 14:30	live BBC One
6th	Warrington Wolves v Wigan Warriors	12 May 2019, 14:15	live BBC One
6th	Huddersfield Giants v St Helens	12 May 2019, 18:05	live Sky Sports
QF	Hull FC v Catalans Dragons	30 May 2019, 19:35	live Sky Sports
QF	Hull KR v Warrington Wolves	31 May 2019, 19:35	live Sky Sports
QF	St Helens v Wakefield Trinity	1 June 2019, 15:15	live BBC One
QF	Bradford Bulls v Halifax	2 June 2019, 14:45	live BBC Two
SF	Warrington Wolves v Hull FC	27 July 2019, 14:00	live BBC One
SF	St Helens v Halifax	27 July 2019, 16:30	live BBC Two
F	Warrington Wolves v St Helens	24 August 2019, 15:00	Live BBC One

== See also ==
- 2019 Women's Challenge Cup
