= 2023 RFL Women's Super League results =

The fixtures for the 2023 Women's Super League were announced on 9 January 2023, with the opening fixture featuring defending champions Leeds playing York in a rematch of the 2022 grand final The round three fixture was brought forward to form a double-header with the men's game between Leeds Rhinos and Huddersfield Giants.

Each team played ten fixtures during the regular season. Play-off fixtures followed the regular season.

== Regular season ==
All times are UK local time (UTC+01:00)

=== Round 1 ===
Betfred Women's Super League: round one
Group	Home	Score	Away	Match Information
Group	Home	Score	Away	Date and Time	Venue	Referee	Attendance
Group 1	Huddersfield Giants	0–80	Leeds Rhinos	14 April, 17:15	John Smiths Stadium	J. Hughes	not recorded
Group 1	York Valkyrie	26–6	St Helens	16 April, 13:00	York Community Stadium	E. Burrow	1,073
Group 1	Warrington Wolves	22–22	Wigan Warriors	16 April, 14:00	Victoria Park, Warrington	J. Pemberton	not recorded
Group 2	Featherstone Rovers	30–8	Barrow Raiders	16 April, 12:00	Post Office Road		not recorded
Group 2	Castleford Tigers	8–20	Salford Red Devils	16 April, 14:00	Wheldon Road		not recorded
Group 2	Bradford Bulls	12–12	Leigh Leopards	16 April, 17:15	Odsal Stadium	J. Wood	not recorded

=== Round 2 ===
Betfred Women's Super League: round two
Group	Home	Score	Away	Match Information
Group	Home	Score	Away	Date and Time	Venue	Referee	Attendance
Group 1	Leeds Rhinos	18–38	St Helens	26 May, 17:30	Headingley Stadium	M. Lynn	(Note: as the men's team are also playing on the same day, attendance will be combined for both games)
Group 1	York Valkyrie	44–4	Warrington Wolves	28 May, 11:30	York Community Stadium
Group 1	Huddersfield Giants	20–30	Wigan Warriors	28 May, 14:00	Laund Hill	J. Pemberton
Group 2	Featherstone Rovers	54–0	Castleford Tigers	30 July, 12:00 (Note: Postponed from 27 May)	Post Office Road	M. Mckelvey
Group 2	Salford Red Devils	10–58	Leigh Leopards	28 May, 12:30	Salford Stadium	L. Flavell
Group 2	Barrow Raiders	42–0	Bradford Bulls	28 May, 14:00	Craven Park	A. Giles

=== Round 3 ===
Betfred Women's Super League: round three
Group	Home	Score	Away	Match Information
Group	Home	Score	Away	Date and Time	Venue	Referee	Attendance
Group 1	Leeds Rhinos	12–34	York Valkyrie	9 April, 15:30	Headingley Stadium	R. Cox	5,308
Group 1	St Helens	26–4	Wigan Warriors	11 June, 13:00	Totally Wicked Stadium
Group 1	Huddersfield Giants	24–32	Warrington Wolves	11 June, 14:00	Laund Hill
Group 2	Barrow Raiders	48–6	Castleford Tigers	11 June, 12:00	Craven Park
Group 2	Leigh Leopards	19–18	Featherstone Rovers	11 June, 14:00	Leigh Sports Village		1,200
Group 2	Bradford Bulls	28–34	Salford Red Devils	11 June, 17:15	Odsal Stadium

=== Round 4 ===
Betfred Women's Super League: round four
Group	Home	Score	Away	Match Information
Group	Home	Score	Away	Date and Time	Venue	Referee	Attendance
Group 1	York Valkyrie	40–6	Wigan Warriors	2 July, 12:00	York Community Stadium	J. Lincoln
Group 1	St Helens	66–0	Huddersfield Giants	2 July, 13:00	Totally Wicked Stadium	A. Williams
Group 1	Warrington Wolves	0–88	Leeds Rhinos	2 July, 14:00	Victoria Park	L. Flavell
Group 2	Salford Red Devils	10–30	Featherstone Rovers	2 July, 12:00	Salford Community Field	M. Clayton
Group 2	Bradford Bulls	16–4	Castleford Tigers	2 July, 17:15	Odsal	C. Hughes
Group 2	Barrow Raiders	0–14	Leigh Leopards	2 July, 17:30 (Note: kick off delayed from 12:00 to 17:30, due to closures on the M6 motorway)	Craven Park	J. Hughes

=== Round 5 ===
Betfred Women's Super League: round five
Group	Home	Score	Away	Match Information
Group	Home	Score	Away	Date and Time	Venue	Referee	Attendance
Group 1	Huddersfield Giants	8–48	York Valkyrie	9 July, 11:00	Laund Hill
Group 1	Wigan Warriors	0–54	Leeds Rhinos	9 July, 12:00	Robin Park Arena
Group 1	Warrington Wolves	6–60	St Helens	9 July, 14:00	Halliwell Jones Stadium
Group 2	Salford Red Devils	12–28	Barrow Raiders	9 July, 12:00	Salford Community Field
Group 2	Castleford Tigers	0–44	Leigh Leopards	9 July, 14:00	Wheldon Road
Group 2	Featherstone Rovers	46–0	Bradford Bulls	9 July, 17:00	Post Office Road

=== Round 6 ===
Betfred Women's Super League: round six
Group	Home	Score	Away	Match Information
Group	Home	Score	Away	Date and Time	Venue	Referee	Attendance
Group 1	Wigan Warriors	20–12	Warrington Wolves	16 July, 12:00	Robin Park Arena
Group 1	York Valkyrie	12–12	Leeds Rhinos	16 July, 12:00	York Community Stadium
Group 1	St Helens	8–18	York Valkyrie	28 July, 12:00	Totally Wicked Stadium
Group 2	Barrow Raiders	24–10	Featherstone Rovers	16 July, 12:00	Craven Park
Group 2	Salford Red Devils	20–10	Castleford Tigers	16 July, 12:00	Salford Community Stadium
Group 2	Leigh Leopards	46–10	Bradford Bulls	16 July, 14:00	Leigh Miners

=== Round 7 ===
Betfred Women's Super League: round seven
Group	Home	Score	Away	Match Information
Group	Home	Score	Away	Date and Time	Venue	Referee	Attendance
Group 1	Wigan Warriors	4–12	St Helens	6 August, 12:00	Robin Park Arena
Group 1	Leeds Rhinos	16–20	Huddersfield Giants	6 August, 12:30	Headingley
Group 1	Warrington Wolves	10–58	York Valkyrie	6 August, 14:00	Victoria Park
Group 2	Featherstone Rovers	20–16	Leigh Leopards	6 August, 12:00	Post Office Road
Group 2	Salford Red Devils	30–4	Bradford Bulls	6 August, 12:00	Salford Community Field
Group 2	Castleford Tigers	0–76	Barrow Raiders	6 August, 14:00	The Mend-A-Hose a Jungle

=== Round 8 ===
Betfred Women's Super League: round eight
Group	Home	Score	Away	Match Information
Group	Home	Score	Away	Date and Time	Venue	Referee	Attendance
Group 1	Wigan Warriors	4–36	York Valkyrie	20 August, 12:00	Robin Park Arena
Group 1	Leeds Rhinos	58–10	Warrington Wolves	20 August, 12:30	Headingley
Group 1	Huddersfield Giants	0–68	St Helens	20 August, 14:00	Laund Hill
Group 2	Castleford Tigers	8–58	Featherstone Rovers	20 August, 14:00	Wheldon Road
Group 2	Leigh Leopards	28–20	Salford Red Devils	20 August, 14:00	Twist Lane
Group 2	Bradford Bulls	4–70	Barrow Raiders	20 August, 17:15	Odsal

=== Round 9 ===
Betfred Women's Super League: round nine
Group	Home	Score	Away	Match Information
Group	Home	Score	Away	Date and Time	Venue	Referee	Attendance
Group 1	Warrington Wolves	26–20	Huddersfield Giants	30 July, 14:00	Victoria Park
Group 1	St Helens	22–34	Leeds Rhinos	3 September, 13:00	Totally Wicked Stadium
Group 1	Wigan Warriors	26–6	Huddersfield Giants	3 September, 14:30	Robin Park Arena
Group 2	Leigh Leopards	22–4	Castleford Tigers	3 September, 12:00	Leigh Miners
Group 2	Bradford Bulls	0–62	Featherstone Rovers	3 September, 12:15	Odsal
Group 2	Barrow Raiders	26–0	Salford Red Devils	3 September, 14:00	Craven Park

=== Round 10 ===
Betfred Women's Super League: round eleven
Group	Home	Score	Away	Match Information
Group	Home	Score	Away	Date and Time	Venue	Referee	Attendance
Group 1	Leeds Rhinos	24–0	Wigan Warriors	9 September, 12:15	Headingley Stadium
Group 1	St Helens	56–6	Warrington Wolves	10 September, 13:00	Totally Wicked Stadium
Group 1	York Valkyrie	60–4	Huddersfield Giants	10 September, 15:00	York Community Stadium
Group 2	Featherstone Rovers	28–18	Salford Red Devils	10 September, 12:00	Post Office Road
Group 2	Castleford Tigers	4–50	Bradford Bulls	10 September, 14:00	Wheldon Road
Group 2	Leigh Leopards	12–14	Barrow Raiders	10 September, 14:00	Leigh Sports Village

== Play-offs ==
=== Group 1 ===
Home	Score	Away	Match Information
Home	Score	Away	Date and Time (Local)	Venue	Referee	Attendance
Semi Finals
York Valkyrie	22–6	Wigan Warriors	23 September 2023, 15:30	York Community Stadium
St Helens	16–20 (a.e.t.)	Leeds Rhinos	23 September 2023, 18:00	Totally Wicked Stadium
Final
York Valkyrie	16–6	Leeds Rhinos	8 October 2023, 15:00	York Community Stadium	Liam Rush	4,547

=== Group 2 ===
Home	Score	Away	Match Information
Home	Score	Away	Date and Time (Local)	Venue	Referee	Attendance
Semi Finals
Barrow Raiders	62–0	Bradford Bulls	24 September 2023, 12:00	Craven Park
Leigh Leopards	28–10	Salford Red Devils	23 September 2023, 14:00	Twist Lane
Final
Barrow Raiders	14–8	Leigh Leopards	8 October 2023, 12:00	York Community Stadium
