= 2017 RFL Women's Super League =

2017 Women's Super League
- Duration: 6 rounds
- Teams: 4
- Matches played: 14
- Champions: Bradford Bulls
- League Leaders' Shield: Bradford Bulls

The 2017 Women's Super League was the inaugural season of the top level rugby league competition for women in England. Run by the Rugby Football League there were four teams in the league; three (Bradford Bulls, Castleford Tigers and Featherstone Rovers) associated with professional clubs in West Yorkshire and one (Thatto Heath) associated with a leading amateur club in Lancashire.

The league was won by Bradford Bulls who went undefeated in the six round regular season before defeating Featherstone Rovers 36–6 in the Grand Final. The win completed a treble for Bradford who in early August had defeated Featherstone 50–16 in the final of the 2017 Challenge Cup.

== Teams ==
Locations of teams in Northern England

Club	Location
Bradford Bulls	Bradford, West Yorkshire
Castleford Tigers	Castleford, West Yorkshire
Featherstone Rovers	Featherstone, West Yorkshire
Thatto Heath St Helens	St Helens, Merseyside

== Results ==
The season comprised six rounds during which each team played the others home and away. The team finishing top of the league automatically qualified for the Grand Final. The teams finishing second and third playing a preliminary final to determine who the other grand finalists were.

=== Round 1 ===
Home	Score	Away	Match Information
Home	Score	Away	Date and Time	Venue	Referee
Castleford Tigers	48–14	Featherstone Rovers	23 July 2017, 14:00		Neil Pascall
Thatto Heath St Helens	26–32	Bradford Bulls	23 July 2017, 14:00		Phillip Salisbury

=== Round 2 ===
Home	Score	Away	Match Information
Home	Score	Away	Date and Time	Venue	Referee
Bradford Bulls	72–18	Castleford Tigers	13 August 2017, 14:00		Neil Pascall
Featherstone Rovers	20–30	Thatto Heath St Helens	13 August 2017, 14:00

=== Round 3 ===
Home	Score	Away	Match Information
Home	Score	Away	Date and Time	Venue	Referee
Featherstone Rovers	0–24	Bradford Bulls	20 August 2017, 14:00 (Note: Report indicates match was postponed/forfeited)		Connor Astbury
Thatto Heath St Helens	64–4	Castleford Tigers	20 August 2017, 14:00		Phillip Salisbury

=== Round 4 ===
Home	Score	Away	Match Information
Home	Score	Away	Date and Time	Venue	Referee
Bradford Bulls	40–10	Thatto Heath St Helens	3 September 2017, 144:00		Neil Pascall
Featherstone Rovers	48–20	Castleford Tigers	3 September 2017, 14:00		Gareth Billingham

=== Round 5 ===
Home	Score	Away	Match Information
Home	Score	Away	Date and Time	Venue	Referee
Castleford Tigers	12–60	Bradford Bulls	10 September 2017, 14:00		Philip Lawley
Thatto Heath St Helens	14–24	Featherstone Rovers	10 September 2017, 14:00		Phillip Salisbury

=== Round 6 ===
Home	Score	Away	Match Information
Home	Score	Away	Date and Time	Venue	Referee
Bradford Bulls	72–10	Featherstone Rovers	24 September 2017, 14:00		Jake Brook
Castleford Tigers	4–38	Thatto Heath St Helens	24 September 2017, 15:00		Neil Horton

== Regular season standings ==
Pos	Team	Pld	W	D	L	PF	PA	PD	Pts	Qualification
1	Bradford Bulls	6	6	0	0	300	76	+224	12	Grand final
2	Thatto Heath St Helens	6	3	0	3	182	124	+58	6	Preliminary final
3	Featherstone Rovers	6	2	0	4	116	208	−92	4	Preliminary final
4	Castleford Tigers	6	1	0	5	106	296	−190	2	

== Play-offs ==
=== Preliminary final ===
Home	Score	Away	Match Information
Home	Score	Away	Date and Time	Venue	Referee
Thatto Heath St Helens	20–21 (g.p.)	Featherstone Rovers	1 October 2017, 14:00		Phillip Salisbury

=== Grand Final ===
7 October 2017
Noon BST

Bradford Bulls	36 – 6	Featherstone Rovers
Tries: Kirsty Moroney, Lois Forsell, Charlotte Booth, Claire Garner, Amy Hardcastle, Charlene Henegan, Haylie Hields; Goals: Claire Garner (4)	report	Tries: Georgia Roche; Goals: Georgia Roche

Manchester Regional Arena
Referee: Neil Pascall
Player of the Match: Lois Forsell
