= 2012 in rugby league =

Top-level rugby league in 2012 centred on Australasia's 2012 NRL season and the Super League XVII. Large scale representative competitions are not expected to occur this year due to the 2013 Rugby League World Cup.

== January ==
- 25: Widnes, England - British Logistics company Stobart Group are announced as Super League's new naming sponsors, replacing engage Mutual Assurance.

== February ==
- 3: Widnes, England - Super League XVII opens with the Wakefield Trinity Wildcats' 32-14 victory over Widnes Vikings at Halton Stadium before a crowd of 8,120.
- 4: Gold Coast, Australia - In the 2012 NRL All Stars match the NRL All stars defeat the Indigenous All Stars 36-28 at Robina Stadium before a crowd of 26,039.
- 10: Sydney, Australia - A new governing body, the Australian Rugby League Commission officially takes over control of the sport in Australia, replacing the National Rugby League's partnership committee between the Australian Rugby League and News Ltd.
- 17: Leeds, England - In the 2012 World Club Challenge, the Leeds Rhinos defeat the Manly-Warringah Sea Eagles 26-12 at Headingley Stadium before a crowd of 21,062.

== March ==
- 1: Newcastle, Australia - The 2012 NRL season opens with the St. George Illawarra Dragons defeating the Newcastle Knights 17-16 in golden point extra time at Newcastle Sports Centre before a crowd of 29,189.

== April ==
- 20: Auckland, New Zealand - The 2012 ANZAC Test is won by Australia who defeated New Zealand 20-12 at Eden Park before a crowd of 35,329.
- 22: Mudgee, Australia - In the annual City vs Country Origin match, the City New South Wales team defeats the Country New South Wales team 24-22 at Glen Willow Regional Sports Stadium before a crowd of 8,621.

== May ==
- 12: Narbonne, France - Elite 1 is won by AS Carcassonne who defeat Pia XIII 26–20 in the Grand Final at Parc des Sports et de l'Amitié.
- 17:Carpentras, France - Elite 2 is won by Palau who defeat Toulouse 34–17 in the Grand Final at Stade Coubertin.
- 20:Narbonne, France - The Coupe de France Lord Derby is won by AS Carcassonne who defeat Pia XIII 14–12 in the Final at Parc des Sports et de l'Amitié.

== June ==
- 5: Sydney, Australia - The Australian Rugby League Commission Chief Executive Officer David Gallop steps down from the role, effective immediately.
- 16: Wrexham, Wales - France defeat Wales 28-16 at the Racecourse Ground before a crowd of 1,464.

== July ==
- 4: Brisbane, Australia - The 2012 State of Origin series is won by Queensland who defeated New South Wales 21-20 at Lang Park before a crowd of 52,437. This was also the most-watched game of rugby league in Australia since the OzTam TV ratings system was introduced in 2001.
- 15: Dewsbury, England - The 2012 Women's Challenge Cup is won by Featherstone Rovers who defeat Bradford Thunderbirds 46–0 at Crown Flatt.
- 25: Leeds, England - the Rugby Football League deducts 6 competition points from the Bradford Bulls' total for the 2012 Super League season for breaching Super League regulations by falling into administration.

== August ==
- 21: Sydney, Australia - The Australian Rugby League Commission announces that the Nine Network and Fox Sports have retained the television broadcast rights for rugby league in Australia, with the signing of a A$1.025 billion, five-year deal.
- 25: London, England - The 2012 Challenge Cup is won by Warrington Wolves who defeated Leeds Rhinos in the Final at Wembley Stadium before a crowd of 79,180.

== September ==
- 4: Sydney, Australia - The 2012 Dally M Awards are held at Sydney Town Hall and Canterbury-Bankstown Bulldogs fullback, Ben Barba wins the Dally M Medal as the NRL's player of the year.
- 30:Sydney, Australia - The 2012 NRL Grand final is won by the Melbourne Storm who defeat the Canterbury-Bankstown Bulldogs 14-4 at ANZ Stadium before a crowd of 82,976. The Clive Churchill Medal was awarded to Cooper Cronk.

== October ==
- 6: Manchester, England - The 2012 Super League Grand final is won by the Leeds Rhinos who defeat the Warrington Wolves 26-18 at Old Trafford before a crowd of 70,676. Kevin Sinfield was awarded the Harry Sunderland Trophy.
- 13: Townsville, Australia - The Australian Kangaroos win the Bill Kelly Memorial Trophy by defeating the New Zealand Kiwis 18-10 at Dairy Farmers Stadium before a crowd of 26,479.
