= 2017 Women's Challenge Cup =

Women's rugby league competition

- Duration: 4 rounds
- Number of teams: 16
- Winners: Bradford Bulls
- Runners-up: Featherstone Rovers
- Biggest home win: Bradford Bulls 92 – 1 Army
- Biggest away win: Barrow 13 – 58 Oulton Raidettes

The 2017 RFL Women's Challenge Cup was an English rugby league knockout tournament competed for by 16 teams during the summer of 2017. The competition was won by Bradford Bulls who beat Featherstone Rovers 50–18 in the final on 30 July 2017.

== Preliminary round ==
The preliminary round was played on 9 April and 23 April:

Home	Score	Away
East Leeds Academy	10–0	Lindley Swifts
West Leeds Eagles	14–24	York City Knights
Hull Wyke	28–16	Brighouse Rangers

== Round One ==
The first round was played on 30 April:

Home	Score	Away
Barrow	13–58	Oulton Raidettes
Bradford Bulls	92–1	Army
Hull Wyke	24–40	Stanningley
Leigh Miners Rangers	68–6	Whitley Bay Barbarians
Wakefield Trinity	6–48	Castleford Tigers
Featherstone Rovers	v	East Leeds
Thatto Heath St Helens	v	York City Knights
Wigan St Patricks	v	Batley Bulldogs

== Quarter Finals ==
The quarter finals were concluded on 28 May:

Home	Score	Away
Bradford Bulls	64–0	Castleford Tigers
Oulton Raidettes	6–30	Thatto Heath St Helens
Featherstone Rovers	50–4	Leigh Miners Rangers
Wigan St Patricks	30–24	Stanningley

== Semi Finals ==
The semi finals were concluded on 18 June:

Home	Score	Away
Bradford Bulls	30–6	Wigan St Patricks
Featherstone Rovers	22–10	Thatto Heath St Helens

== Final ==
The final took place of 30 July:

30 July 2017
3:00 pm BST

Bradford Bulls	50 – 16	Featherstone Rovers
Tries: Amy Hardcastle (2), Kirsty Moroney (2), Savannah Andrade, Charlotte Booth, Shona Hoyle, Lois Forsell, Lauren Hickey, Jess Courtman; Goals: Claire Garner (2), Courtman (3)	report	Tries: Brogan Churm, Sarah Dunn, Kayleigh Bullman; Goals: Nat Gilmour (2)

Heworth ARLFC
Attendance: 1,000+

== Challenge Shield ==
=== Shield Round One ===
The first round was played on 28 May:

Home	Score	Away
East Leeds Academy	0–48	Whitley Bay Barbarians
Hull Wyke	0–24	Batley Bulldogs
Wakefield Trinity	0–36	Army
York City Knights	24–16	Barrow

=== Shield Semi Finals ===
The semi-finals were played on 25 June:

Home	Score	Away
Batley Bulldogs	12–18	Army
York City Knights	24–0	Whitley Bay Barbarians

=== Shield Final ===
The final took place on 30 July:

30 July 2017
1:00 pm BST

York City Knights	26 – 24	Army
	report

Heworth ARLFC
