= 2012 Women's Challenge Cup =

Women's rugby league competition

- Winners: Featherstone Rovers
- Runners-up: Bradford Thunderbirds
- Biggest home win: Widnes Vikings 86 – 0 Crosfields
- Biggest away win: Nottingham Outlaws 0 – 44 Featherstone Rovers

The 2012 Women's Challenge Cup was an English rugby league knockout tournament competed for during the summer of 2012. This was the first staging of the Challenge Cup and it was won by Featherstone Rovers who beat Bradford Thunderbirds 46–0 in the final. The Challenge Shield was won by Widnes Vikings who beat Stanningley 40–10 in the final. Both finals took place on 15 July 2012 at the Tetley's Stadium, Dewsbury.

== Round One ==
The first round was played on 15 April:

- Chorley Panthers 54 – 10 Leigh Miners Rangers
- Hunslet Hawks 42 – 4 Brighouse
- Leigh East 34 – 0 West Craven Warriors
- Ovendon 4 – 44 Whinmoor Warriors
- Stanningley 40 – 10 Guiseley
- Widnes Vikings 86 – 0 Crosfields
- Wigan St Patricks 66 – 0 Oulton Raidettes

== Round Two ==
Leeds Akkies, West London and the six Premier Division sides entered the competition in the second round which was played on 13 May:

- Bradford Thunderbirds 58 – 6 Stanningley
- Chorley Panthers 24 – 0 Leeds Akkies
- Featherstone Rovers 24 – 0 Leigh East
- Hunslet Hawks 18 – 48 Castleford Panthers
- Wigan St Patricks 4 – 16 Nottingham Outlaws
- Widnes Vikings 0 – 10 Warrington Wolves
- Coventry Bears – Bye
- West London Sharks v Whinmoor

== Quarter Finals ==
The quarter-finals were played on 27 May and 17 June:

- Bradford Thunderbirds 64 – 10 Chorley Panthers
- Castleford Panthers 30 – 6 Whinmoor Warriors
- Coventry Bears 18 – 30 Warrington Wolves
- Nottingham Outlaws 0 – 44 Featherstone Rovers

== Semi Finals ==
The semi-finals were played on 1 July:

- Bradford Thunderbirds 64 – 6 Castleford Panthers
- Featherstone Rovers 50 – 10 Warrington Wolves

== Final ==
The final was played on 15 July with a score of Bradford Thunderbirds 0–46 Featherstone Rovers

15 July 2012
3:30 pm BST

Bradford Thunderbirds	0 – 46	Featherstone Rovers
	report	Tries: Lindsay Anfield (3), Andrea Dobson (2), Emma Slowe, Dani Titterington, Dani Bound, Paula McCourt; Goals: Andrea Dobson (3), Kim Field (2)

Tetley's Stadium, Dewsbury
Attendance: 600
Referee: John Seymour
Player of the Match: Andrea Dobson

== Challenge Shield ==
=== Shield Round One ===
The first round took place on 27 May and 29 May:

- Guiseley 36 – 8 Oulton Raidettes
- Hunslet Hawks 64 – 14 Ovenden
- West Craven Warriors 22 – 18 Leigh Miners Rangers

=== Shield Quarter Finals ===
The quarter-finals took place on 17 June:

- Brighouse 0 – 32 Stanningley
- Crosfields 0 – 24 Hunslet Hawks
- West Craven Warriors 20 – 44 Guiseley
- Widnes Vikings 58 – 4 Wigan St Patricks

=== Shield Semi Finals ===
The semi-finals took place on 1 July:

- Guiseley 0 – 16 Stanningley
- Hunslet Hawks 4 – 46 Widnes Vikings

=== Shield Final ===
The final was played on 15 July with a score of Widnes Vikings 40–10 Stanningley.

15 July 2012
1:30 pm BST

Widnes Vikings	40 – 10	Stanningley
Tries: Tara-Jane Stanley (2), Gemma Stanley (2), Laura Burke, Rebecca Sloan, Victoria Whitfield	report	Tries: Manina Spurr, Helen Martin

Tetley's Stadium, Dewsbury
Player of the Match: Tara-Jane Stanley
