= 2026 Women's Challenge Cup =

Women's rugby league competition

- Duration: Group stage plus three knockout rounds
- Number of teams: 11
- Winners: Wigan Warriors
- Runners-up: St Helens
- Biggest home win: Wigan Warriors 112–0 London Broncos (25 April 2026)
- Biggest away win: Leigh Leopards 0–82 Leeds Rhinos (4 April 2026)

The 2026 Women's Challenge Cup (sponsored as the Betfred Women's Challenge Cup) was the 14th staging of the Rugby Football League's cup competition for women's rugby league clubs. Wigan Warriors defeated St Helens 54–6 in the final to retain the title.

== Format ==
The competition had a similar format to 2025 although the withdrawal of Salford Red Devils meant the competition was reduced from 12 to 11 teams.

The draw for the group stage saw three groups of three competing in a single round robin with the matches to be played over three consecutive weekends in April 2026 from which the group winners and runners-up advanced to the knockout rounds. The fourth group has only two teams, both of which advanced to the quarter-finals following a single match to determine home advantage for the next round. The quarter-finals were played on the last weekend in April. The semi-finals took place on the weekend of 9/10 May 2026, and the final was played at Wembley Stadium, London, on 30 May 2026 alongside the final of the men's competition.

Wigan Warriors, winners in 2025, were seeded together with Leeds Rhinos, St Helens and York Valkyrie. These four were drawn in different groups in the group stage. The draw for the group stages was made on 12 January.The groups were drawn as follows:

Groups
Group A	Group B	Group C	Group D
Catalans Dragons (Note: Catalans Dragons are making their debut in the competition. They compete as St Esteve XIII Catalan in the Elite 1 Féminine (the top tier of French women's rugby league) and are also known as the Catalan Goddesses (Les Déesses Catalanes). They have previously taken part in the RFL Women's Nines in 2022.); St Helens; Huddersfield Giants	Leeds Rhinos; Leigh Leopards; London Broncos	Cardiff Demons; Featherstone Rovers; Wigan Warriors	Barrow Raiders; York Valkyrie

== Group stage ==
The fixture list for the group stage was announced on 28 January 2026.

Group stage: week one
Group	Home	Score	Away	Match information
Group	Home	Score	Away	Date and time	Venue	Referee	Attendance
B	Leigh Leopards	0–82	Leeds Rhinos	4 April, 12:00	Sutton Park	L. Breheny
C	Featherstone Rovers	6–78	Wigan Warriors	4 April, 13:00	Post Office Road
A	Huddersfield Giants	14–44	St Helens	5 April, 14:00	Laund Hill

Group stage: week two
Group	Home	Score	Away	Match information
Group	Home	Score	Away	Date and time	Venue	Referee	Attendance
C	Wigan Warriors	76–6	Cardiff Demons	11 April, 14:00	Edge Hall Road Community Stadium	L. Breheny
A	Huddersfield Giants	24–22	Catalans Dragons	12 April, 13:00	Laund Hill
D	York Valkyrie	54–12	Barrow Raiders	12 April, 13:30	York Community Stadium
B	London Broncos	20–8	Leigh Leopards	12 April, 14;00	The Hazelwood Centre

Group stage: week three
Group	Home	Score	Away	Match information
Group	Home	Score	Away	Date and time	Venue	Referee	Attendance
C	Cardiff Demons	24–12	Featherstone Rovers	18 April, 14:00	Cardiff University Sports Park	C. Davies
A	St Helens	62–4	Catalans Dragons	19 April, 12:00	BrewDog Stadium
B	Leeds Rhinos	72–0	London Broncos	19 April, 14:00	West Park

=== Standings ===
Group A
Pos	Team	Pld	W	D	L	PF	PA	PD	Pts	Qualification
1	St Helens	2	2	0	0	106	18	+88	4	Advance to knock-out stages
2	Huddersfield Giants	2	1	0	1	38	66	−28	2	Advance to knock-out stages
3	Catalans Dragons	2	0	0	2	26	86	−60	0	

Group B
Pos	Team	Pld	W	D	L	PF	PA	PD	Pts	Qualification
1	Leeds Rhinos	2	2	0	0	154	0	+154	4	Advance to knock-out stages
2	London Broncos	2	1	0	1	20	80	−60	2	Advance to knock-out stages
3	Leigh Leopards	2	0	0	2	8	102	−94	0	

Group C
Pos	Team	Pld	W	D	L	PF	PA	PD	Pts	Qualification
1	Wigan Warriors	2	2	0	0	154	12	+142	4	Advance to knock-out stages
2	Cardiff Demons	2	1	0	1	30	88	−58	2	Advance to knock-out stages
3	Featherstone Rovers	2	0	0	2	18	102	−84	0	

Group D
Pos	Team	Pld	W	D	L	PF	PA	PD	Pts	Qualification
1	York Valkyrie	1	1	0	0	54	12	+42	2	Advance to knock-out stages
2	Barrow Raiders	1	0	0	1	12	54	−42	0	Advance to knock-out stages

== Quarter-finals ==
The quarter-finals took place over the weekend of 25/26 April.

Challenge Cup quarter-final fixtures
Home	Score	Away	Match information
Home	Score	Away	Date and time	Venue	Referee	Attendance
Wigan Warriors	112–0	London Broncos	25 April 2026, 14:00	Edge Hall Road
St Helens	68–6	Barrow Raiders	25 April 2026, 14:30	BrewDog Stadium	A. Williams
Leeds Rhinos	68–0	Cardiff Demons	25 April 2026, 15:15	Headingley	T. Topping-Higson
York Valkyrie	34–10	Huddersfield Giants	26 April 2026, 14:00	York Community Stadium	L. Breheny

== Semi-finals ==
The semi-finals were played over the weekend of 9/10 May and were double-headers with the men's semi-finals.

Challenge Cup semi-final fixtures
Home	Score	Away	Match information
Home	Score	Away	Date and time	Venue	Referee	Attendance
Wigan Warriors	52–0	York Valkyrie	9 May 2026, 11:30	Halliwell Jones Stadium	T. Jones
St Helens	30–14	Leeds Rhinos	10 May 2026, 13:00	Eco-Power Stadium	R. Cox

== Final ==
The final took place on Saturday 30 May 2026, as part of a double-header with the men's final.

Challenge Cup final
Home	Score	Away	Match information
Home	Score	Away	Date and time	Venue	Referee	Attendance
Wigan Warriors	54–6	St Helens	30 May 2026, 11:45	Wembley Stadium	A. Moore
