= St Helens R.F.C. Women =

English rugby league, based in St Helens, Merseyside

St Helens Women
Club information
- Full name: St Helens Women's Rugby Football Club
- Nickname(s): The Saints; The Red V
- Short name: Saints
- Colours: White and red
- Founded: 2013; 13 years ago (As Thatto Heath Crusaders)
- Website: saintsrlfc.com

Current details
- Ground: BrewDog Stadium (18,000)
- Coach: Derek Hardman and Craig Richards
- Captain: Jodie Cunningham
- Competition: RFL Women's Super League
- 2025: 2nd
- Current season

Uniforms
Home colours	Away colours

Records
- League Championships: 5 (2013, 2014, 2015, 2016, 2021)
- Challenge Cups: 8 (2013, 2014, 2015, 2016, 2021, 2022, 2023, 2024)

The rugby league club St Helens R.F.C. have operated a women's team since they took some women from Thatto Heath Crusaders, and other women's sides in 2017 ahead of the 2018 season. They won four successive Challenge Cups from 2013 to 2016, and again from 2021–2024. The 2016 win formed part of their treble winning season. The side won the 2021 Women's Challenge Cup after beating York City Knights, adding to the four cup titles won as Thatto Heath. That season, they also completed the treble for the second time.

In 2024 the club announced it would become semi-professional, and start making match payments to players, becoming the third British side to do so after Leeds and York who started the season prior.

== 2025 squad ==
2025 St Helens Women's Squad
First team squad			Coaching staff
(England) 1 Beri Salihi – FB, SH; (England) 2 Phoebe Hook – WG, CE; (England) 3 Erin Stott – CE, FB; (England) 4 Amy Hardcastle – CE; (England) 5 Leah Burke – WG; (England) 6 Zoe Harris – SO, SH; (England) 7 Faye Gaskin – SH, SO; (England) 8 Vicky Whitfield – PR, SR; (England) 9 Katie Mottershead – HK; (Canada) 10 Chantelle Crowl – SR; (England) 11 Shona Hoyle – SR, positions; (England) 12 Emily Rudge – SR; (England) 13 Jodie Cunningham (c) – SR	(England) 14 Naomi WIlliams – CE (vc); (England) 15 Georgia Sutherland – SR, PR; (England) 16 Darcy Stott – PR, SR; (England) 17 Caitlin Casey – SH, HK; (England) 18 Rachael Woosey – CE, WG; (England) 19 Caitlin Maylor – HK; (England) 20 Erin McDonald – PR; (England) 21 Amy Taylor – HB; (England) 22 Rebecca Rotheram – FB; (England) 23 Luci McColm – WG, CE; (England) 24 Alyx Bridge – SR; (England) 25 Danielle McGifford – WG	(England) 25 Emma Lowe; (England) 26 Hollie Brussels; (England) 28 Georgina Holmes – WG, CE; (England) 29 Hollie Bawden – SR, CE	Head coach: (England) Derek Hardman & Craig Richards; Legend: (c) Captain(s); (vc) Vice-captain(s); Updated: 28 July 2025; Source(s):

== Seasons ==
Season	League									Play-offs	Challenge Cup
Season	Division	P	W	D	L	F	A	Pts	Pos	Play-offs	Challenge Cup
2013	WRL	11	10	0	1	404	102	20	1st	Won in Grand Final	W
2014	WRL	Unknown								Won in Grand Final	W
2015	WRL	14	11	0	3	586	84	22	2nd	Won in Grand Final	W
2016	WRL	Unknown							1st	Won in Grand Final	W
2017	Super League	6	3	0	3	182	124	6	2nd	Lost in Preliminary Final	SF
2018	Super League	12	8	1	3	316	130	17	3rd	Lost in Semi Final	R2
2019	Super League	14	12	1	1	522	131	25	2nd	Lost in Semi Final	SF
2020	Super League	Cancelled due to the COVID-19 pandemic									
2021	Super League	11	10	0	1	628	42	20	1st	Won in Grand Final	W
2022	Super League	8	6	0	2	314	63	12	2nd	Lost in Semi Final	W
2023	Super League	10	7	0	3	362	126	14	2nd	Lost in Semi Final	W
2024	Super League	14	13	0	1	614	88	26	1st	Lost in Grand Final	W
2025	Super League	14	11	2	1	590	112	24	2nd	Lost in Grand Final	RU
2026	Super League	TBD									RU

== Honours ==
- Women's Super League/Women's Rugby League
  Grand Final
  Winners (5): 2013, 2014, 2015, 2016, 2021
  League Leaders' Shield
  Winners (4): 2013, 2016, 2021, 2024
  Runners-up (5): 2015, 2017, 2019, 2022, 2023
- Women's Challenge Cup
  Winners (8): 2013, 2014, 2015, 2016, 2021, 2022, 2023, 2024
  Runners-up (1): 2025
