= Emily Rudge =

England international rugby league footballer

Personal information
- Full name: Emily Kate Rudge
- Born: 11 November 1991 (age 34) Warrington, England

Playing information
- Position: Second-row
Club
Years	Team	Pld	T	G	FG	P
2013–14	Thatto Heath Crusaders
2015	Featherstone Rovers
2016–17	Thatto Heath Crusaders
2018–26	St Helens	53	19	0	0	76
	Total	53	19	0	0	76
Representative
Years	Team	Pld	T	G	FG	P
2008–	England	32	17	0	0	68

Emily Rudge is a British former rugby league player who last played for St Helens Women in the Women's Super League. She plays at second-row. Born in Warrington Rudge attended Cardinal Newman High School and first played rugby league for a local Warrington club before joining Thatto Heath Crusaders. While at Warrington she was first selected for the England women's national rugby league team in 2008, aged 16. In 2011, Rudge was in the Warrington team that won the Championship Final of the Women's Rugby League Conference in August, before joining for Featherstone Rovers for the interim season before the launch of the first summer-based season.

In 2014, Rudge scored tries for Thatto Heath in their 32–24 Challenge Cup final and Premier Division 36–14 play-off final wins over the Bradford Thunderbirds. In June 2015, while at back at Featherstone Rovers, Rudge was part of the England team that played a two-match series against France. Rudge was part of the Featherstone team that reached the 2015 Championship final, losing 18–12 to Thatto Heath. The following season she returned to Thatto Heath and scored twice in their 62–6 Challenge Cup final win over the Leigh Miners Rangers, and once in their Grand Final win over the Bradford Bulls.

At the end of the 2018 season Rudge was named captain of the England team for the test match against France and in 2019 was named as England captain for the World 9s tournament in Australia in October 2019 and also the two-match test series against Papua New Guinea in November 2019. In the first test match against Papua New Guinea on 9 November 2019 Rudge became the first England player to score four tries in a test match as England won 24–10.

Rudge was one of the three nominees for the 2019 Telegraph Woman of Steel award but lost out to Leeds' Courtney Hill.

In March 2023, Rudge stepped down from her role as England captain and was succeeded by Jodie Cunningham.

Away from rugby Rudge is a PE teacher at a high school in St Helens. In 2018, Rudge married Gemma Walsh who also played in the Women's Super League for St Helens' rivals Wigan Warriors Women.

Ahead of the 2026 Challenge Cup final, Rudge announced that she would be retiring at the end of the 2026 season.

== Test match appearances ==
With her appearance in the October 2021 test match against France, Rudge equalled the record for most test match caps, 24, for England women's national rugby league team.

As of May 2026 Rudge has played 32 matches for England, with her most recent appearance being against France in June 2024.
