= West London Sharks =

Defunct English amateur rugby league club, based in Chiswick, West London

Club information
- Full name: West London Sharks RLFC
- Colours: Navy, Maroon & Gold
- Founded: 1997; 29 years ago
- Exited: 2013; 13 years ago
- Website: www.westlondonsharks.co.uk

Former details
- Ground: Chiswick Rugby Football Club
- Competition: Rugby League Conference South Premier

West London Sharks RLFC was a rugby league team based in Chiswick, London. They competed in the South Premier Division of the Rugby League Conference. The club ran an additional social side in the London League competition and a women's team playing in the Women's South competition.

West London Sharks merged with South London Storm to form South West London Chargers in 2013.

== History ==
West London was one of the founding ten teams of the pilot Southern Conference League in 1997 competing in the Eastern Division. The team was based on the old London ARL clubs, Brent-Ealing. Ealing were formed in 1967 and were based at six grounds in the first 21 years. Another club London Colonials lasted another four years in the London League before merging into West London at the start of the Southern Conference, they

The club became West London Sharks for the renamed Rugby League Conference in 1998 and the London Broncos briefly ran the club as their 'alliance' team. This time they played in the Southern Division. West London entered a second string in the London League in 2000.

In 2001–2003, the division was renamed London & South Division but was the South Division for 2004 when West London Sharks won it. Rugby union international Trevor Leota starred for West London that season.

In 2005, West London stepped up to the South Premier Division.

West London won the South Premier in 2008 and the 'A' team won the London League. The first team made it to the Harry Jepson grand final but lost to Nottingham Outlaws 8 - 28.

West London Sharks merged with South London Storm to form South West London Chargers in 2013.

== Juniors ==
West London Sharks Youth ran sides at under-13, under-14 and under-16 in the London Junior League. Boys under the age of 12 can play for cluster clubs Feltham Falcons or Whitton Warriors.

== Club honours ==
- RLC South Division: 2004
- RLC South Premier: 2008, 2009
- London League: 2003, 2008
- Harry Jepson Trophy: 2009
- Women's Rugby League Conference: 2008

== Club Officials ==
- Club Chairman: Mike Byrnes
- Club Secretary: Donny Lam
- Director of Rugby: Mark Barnes
- Women's Team Manager: Christina Ovenden
