= Trevor Leota =

Samoa international rugby union player

- Born: 8 February 1975 (age 51) Auckland, New Zealand
- Height: 1.75 m (5 ft 9 in)
- Weight: 125 kg (19 st 10 lb)
- School: Kelston Boys' High School
- Notable relative: David Tua (distant cousin)

Rugby union career
- Position: Hooker
Senior career
Years	Team	Apps	(Points)
1997–2005	Wasps	202	(35)
2005–2006	Cheetahs	8	(10)
2008–2009	Mont-de-Marsan	18	(0)
Super Rugby
Years	Team	Apps	(Points)
2006	Cheetahs	1	(0)
International career
Years	Team	Apps	(Points)
1997–2005	Samoa	30	(5)

Trevor Leota (born 8 February 1975) is a New Zealand-born former rugby union player for Samoa. He currently coaches at the Footscray Bulldogs in Melbourne, Australia. Leota was born in Auckland, New Zealand, and won 30 caps for Samoa.

== Career ==
He is a hooker and has been widely recognised as one of the hardest tacklers in the game. He made his debut for Western Samoa in 1995 during a tour of the UK. He caught Nigel Melville's eye and was signed by Wasps in 1997, where he quickly became something of a cult figure for his uncompromising approach on the field, his colourful hair styles and his friendly nature off the pitch. Whilst at Wasps he helped them win the Anglo-Welsh Cup in 1999 and 2000; scoring a try in the latter final. For two weeks prior to the 2004 Heineken Cup final, Wasps strength and conditioning coach Paul Stridgeon moved into Leota's house to prevent him from indulging his passion for buckets of KFC. He helped Wasps win a hat-trick of Premiership titles in 2003, 2004 and 2005, playing in all three finals (2005 as a replacement).

He is a second cousin of Va'aiga Tuigamala and a former member of the same New Zealand schoolboys side as Jonah Lomu and Christian Cullen.

He is a distant cousin of heavyweight boxer David Tua. He played for the Cheetahs. He has previously played for Auckland and Te Atatū. He previously played for Stade Montois in the French Top 14. He was a member of Samoa's 1999 World Cup squad and played for the Barbarians in May 2001. He was also one of the only rugby union players allowed to play rugby league over the 2004 summer season in order to keep his weight down. He played for West London Sharks in the Rugby League Conference.

In 2010 he joined Welsh rugby league club Bridgend Blue Bulls in the Rugby League Conference Welsh Premier.

On 28 August 2010 he played in a friendly match for Nuneaton Rugby Club against Blackheath, playing prop.
