= Jodie Cunningham =

England international rugby league player

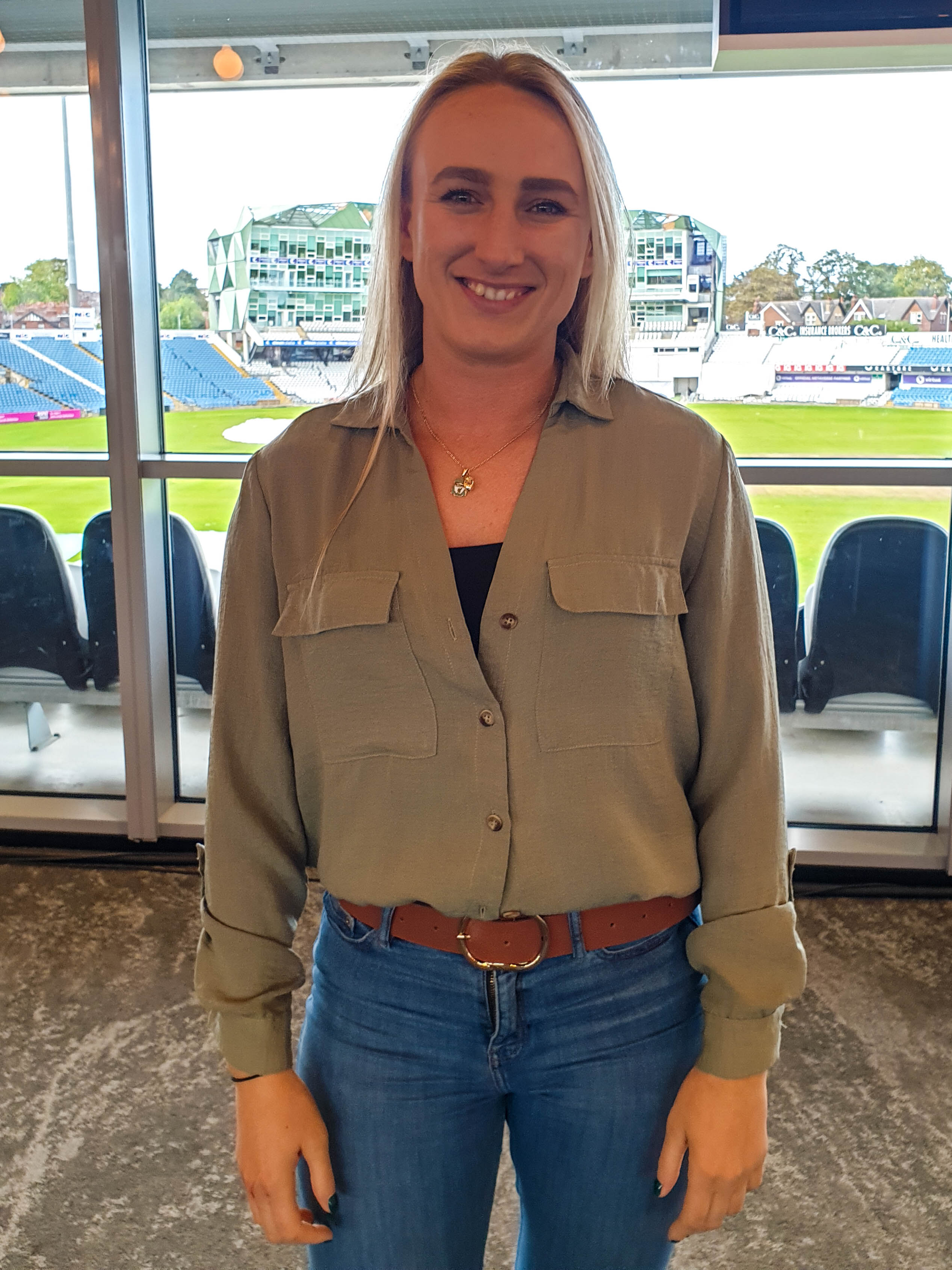

Personal information
- Born: 5 December 1991 (age 34) Warrington, Cheshire, England

Playing information
- Position: Fullback, Loose forward
Club
Years	Team	Pld	T	G	FG	P
2018–	St Helens	53	30	0	0	120
Representative
Years	Team	Pld	T	G	FG	P
2009–26	England	35	10	0	0	40
- Source: As of 30 October 2026

Jodie Cunningham (born 5 December 1991) is an English rugby league footballer who plays as a fullback or loose forward at international level for England and domestically for St Helens in the Women's Super League.

Cunningham started paying rugby while a pupil at Cardinal Newman Catholic High School, Warrington and was selected to play for England while still in the sixth-form and playing for Warrington Ladies RC. In 2011, Cunningham was in the Warrington team that won the Championship Final of the Women's Rugby League Conference.

While a student at Leeds University, Cunningham played in the 2013 Women's Rugby League World Cup and joined Thatto Heath Crusaders and was a member of the team that won the Challenge Cup in four successive seasons from 2013 to 2016.

Cunningham was vice-captain of the England team in the 2017 Women's Rugby League World Cup and in March 2018 Cunningham became a member of the newly-formed St Helens women's team, though she missed most of the 2018 season due to rehabilitation after surgery on an anterior cruciate ligament injury suffered during the 2017 season.

For the 2019 season, Cunningham was appointed co-captain of the St Helens side alongside Tara Jones With the 2020 season cancelled, 2021 saw Cunningham appointed captain of the team and she led the side to the first treble since the creation of the Women's Super League. Cunningham was also named 2021 Woman of Steel.

Cunningham worked as community engagement lead for the organisers of the 2021 Rugby League World Cup as well as being an ambassador for the women's tournament.

Cunningham was appointed as the RFL's National Women’s and Girls’ Development Manager in November 2021. In January 2024 she left that post to take up a new post with St Helens as head of women’s pathways and performance.

2022 saw St Helens retain the Challenge Cup with Cunningham scoring a try in the final against Leeds Rhinos. In the Super League Cunningham captained St Helens to second place in the league but the team were unable to repeat their 2021 successes losing in the play-off semi-final to eventual Grand Final winners Leeds.

In April 2023, Cunningham was named as captain of the England team, succeeding St Helens teammate Emily Rudge.

Ahead of the 2026 Challenge Cup final, Cunningham announced that she would be retiring at the end of the 2026 season.
