= Conference Challenge Trophy =

Rugby league competition, 2012 to 2017

- Sport: Rugby league
- Instituted: 2012
- Ceased: 2017
- Number of teams: 97
- Country: England; Wales
- Most titles: Leigh Miners Rangers (3 titles)

The Conference Challenge Trophy was a knockout cup competition organised by the Rugby Football League for both the National Conference League and Conference League South clubs. It was launched in 2012 and last held in 2017.

== Results ==
List of trophy finals
Year	Winners	Score	Runner–up	Report
2012	Leigh Miners Rangers	32–24	Egremont Rangers	
2013	Leigh Miners Rangers	42–14	Wigan St Patricks	
2014	West Hull	36–16	East Leeds	
2015	Leigh Miners Rangers	32–22	Wath Brow Hornets	
2016	Rochdale Mayfield	24–20	Hunslet Club Parkside	
2017	Hunslet Club Parkside	22–0	Wigan St Patricks	
