= Tara Jones =

English rugby league player and referee

Personal information
- Born: 10 July 1996 (age 30) Germany

Playing information
- Position: Hooker
Club
| Years | Team | Pld | T | G | FG | P |
|---|---|---|---|---|---|---|
| 2018–24 | St Helens | 93 | 4 | 0 | 0 | 188 |
Representative
| Years | Team | Pld | T | G | FG | P |
| 2015–24 | England | 13 | 6 | 0 | 0 | 24 |

Refereeing information
| Years | Competition | Apps |
| 2022– | National Conference League | 3 |
| 2022– | Challenge Cup | 1 |
| 2024– | RFL League 1 | 1 |
| 2026– | Super League | 1 |
- Source: As of 6 November 2026

Tara Louise Jones MBE is an English rugby league referee and former player. She was hooker for St Helens and the England national team. Her career took off in 2018, when she captained St Helens in their debut women's Super League. She is also first female match official for the men's Super League.

== Early years ==
Jones was born in Germany and moved to Warrington as a child, taking up rugby at Crosfields Amateur Rugby League Football Club with her brother. She played with the team until she was eleven and no longer allowed to play with boys; she was able to play with the Warrington Girls' team, but also started refereeing courses as a way to continue being involved, finding that while the girls' team existed, it was underdeveloped compared to the boys'.

== Career ==
=== Playing ===
Jones played for Thatto Heath Crusaders women's side in St Helens at the start of her career. In 2014 she helped them to defeat Bradford Bulls Women in the Women's Challenge Cup, taking the same title against Featherstone Rovers the following year, and Leigh Miners Rangers the year after that.

Thatto Heath, smaller than the nearby St Helens R.F.C. Women, was bought out by this club ahead of the 2018 season. Jones was retained. She became St Helens' captain, leading them in the debut season of the RFL Women's Super League. For the 2019 season, she and Jodie Cunningham were named co-captains. During the COVID-19 pandemic in 2020, all rugby league except the men's Super League shut down; Jones, whose three-pronged career is playing, officiating, and coaching rugby, had to find alternative employment for the year. In 2021, she helped St Helens to win all three available trophies: the Challenge Cup, League Leaders' Shield, and Grand Final. Continuing in the team, in 2022 they said that her leadership and ball-playing thinking were "irreplaceable for the side".

Internationally, Jones debuted for England in 2015 on tour to France, playing in both matches and scoring twice in the first match. In November 2019, Jones played in both games against Papua New Guinea. She then scored a try for England in their 60–0 defeat of Wales in 2021, the squad's first game since the Papua New Guinea tour. She was then called up for preparation matches for the 2021 Women's Rugby League World Cup, and the World Cup itself, postponed and held in 2022. She was one of eight St Helens players who played the first match in this women's World Cup, passing well and scoring a try in their 72–4 victory over debutants Brazil.

Jones announced her retirement from her playing career after St Helens defeat by York Valkyrie in the 2024 RFL Women's Super League Grand Final. The announcement was concurrent with the news from the Rugby Football League that Jones is joining the full-time match officials squad.

=== Officiating ===
Having started refereeing in 2009 at the age of twelve, Jones is part of the Warrington referees' society. Among her experience are Schools Championship games, including at Wembley. She became a grade two referee in early 2018, getting the opportunity to officiate academy games at the highest level. In January 2018, she took the lead at two Challenge Cup matches. She became the first female on-field match official in the (men's) Super League on 11 March 2018, serving as an in-goal judge; she said that the support she got for this was "a bit surreal really", expressing her own support for the other female referees in the game coming through. While away for her first England game in November 2019, Jones was named National Conference League referee of the year. As of September 2022, she has been the principal referee for three games, all in the Challenge Cup.

Jones has said that she wants to become a higher-ranked official, but her priority is playing. While the mixed 2021 Rugby League World Cup hosted in England in 2022 saw female Australian and New Zealand match officials, there were no female English match officials; Jones would have been the selection but declined in order to play. She had made the same choice for the 2017 Women's Rugby League World Cup, but was not picked for the team and so did not appear.

Jones became the first woman to referee a senior men's match in the northern hemisphere when she took charge of the League One match between Oldham and Cornwall on 14 April 2024. (Note: Sarah Bennison refereed the second half of a league game between Workington Town and Swinton in 2011. Bennison was one of the touch judges and took over after the referee, Jamie Leahy, developed an uncontrollable nose-bleed.)

At the end of 2024, Jones was appointed to the RFL full-time match officials squad, becoming the first woman to be appointed. In December 2025, Jones was made a Member of the Order of the British Empire (MBE) for services to rugby league football, as a referee, in the 2026 New Year Honours.

Born in Germany where her father was stationed in the British Army, Jones has a close affinity with the Armed Forces and has officiated in the annual Armed Forces Rugby League festival at Crosfields ARLFC since its inception. In June 2025, she refereed the centrepiece game between Crosfields and the British Army.

In February 2026, Jones became the first woman to officiate a game involving Super League clubs, taking charge of the Challenge Cup third round tie between Swinton Lions and Wakefield Trinity. The following month she was named as the first woman to officiate a Super League fixture; namely the Round 6 game between Wigan Warriors and Huddersfield Giants on 28 March 2026.

== See also ==
- Julia Lee, the first English female rugby league referee at any level
- Caitlin Beevers, the first woman to referee a rugby league match at Wembley
