= RFL Women's Rugby League =

Uk sporting competition

- Sport: Rugby league
- Instituted: 2012
- Ceased: 2017
- Replaced by: RFL Women's Super League; RFL Women's Championship
- Country: England
- Most titles: Thatto Heath St Helens (4 titles)
- Related competition: Women's Rugby League Conference; RFL Women's Challenge Cup

The RFL Women's Rugby League was an amateur women's rugby league competition in the United Kingdom. The competition was a successor to the Women's Rugby League Conference, but moved the season to run between March and October. The competition was first played for in 2012 and ran for five full seasons. The 2017 season was not completed as the league was replaced in July 2017 by a new three division structure comprising the Women's Super League, the Women's Championship and the Women's Championship 1.

== Teams ==
Women's Rugby League clubs
Club	Location	Seasons
Barrow	Barrow-in-Furness, Cumbria	2017
Batley Bulldogs	Batley, West Yorkshire	2017
Bradford Thunderbirds; Bradford Bulls	Bradford, West Yorkshire	2012–17
Brighouse Rangers	Brighouse, West Yorkshire	2012–16
Castleford Panthers	Castleford, West Yorkshire	2012–13
Castleford Tigers	Castleford, West Yorkshire	2017
Chorley Panthers	Chorley, Lancashire	2012–13
Coventry Bears	Coventry, Warwickshire	2012–13
Crosfields	Warrington, Cheshire	2012–14
Featherstone Rovers	Featherstone, West Yorkshire	2012–17
Fryston Warriors	Castleford, West Yorkshire	2014
Guildford Giants	Guildford, Surrey	2012
Guiseley	Bradford, West Yorkshire	2012
Hemel Stags	Hemel Hempstead, Hertfordshire	2012
Hunslet Hawks	Leeds, West Yorkshire	2012–15
Leigh East	Leigh, Greater Manchester	2012–13
Leigh Miners Rangers	Leigh, Greater Manchester	2012–17
Lindley Swifts	Huddersfield, West Yorkshire	2016
Normanton Knights	Normanton, West Yorkshire	2013–16
Nottingham Outlaws	Nottingham, Nottinghamshire	2012
Oulton Raidettes	Leeds, West Yorkshire	2012–17
Ovendon	Halifax, West Yorkshire	2012
Rochdale Hornets	Rochdale, Greater Manchester	2014–16
Royal Navy	Portsmouth, Hampshire	2012
Selby Warriors	Selby, North Yorkshire	2014–16
Southampton Spitfires	Southampton, Hampshire	2012
Stanningley	Leeds, West Yorkshire	2012–17
Thatto Heath St Helens	St. Helens, Merseyside	2013–17
Wakefield Trinity	Wakefield. West Yorkshire	2017
Warrington Wolves	Warrington, Cheshire	2012
West Craven Warriors	Barnoldswick, Lancashire	2012–15
West London Sharks	Chiswick, London	2012
Whinmoor Warriors	Leeds, West Yorkshire	2012–14
Widnes Vikings	Widnes, Cheshire	2012
Wigan St Patricks	Wigan, Greater Manchester	2012–17

== Champions ==
Season	Champions	Score	Runners-up	League Leaders	Ref.
2012	Featherstone Rovers (T) (Note: Team also won the Women's Challenge Cup in the same season thereby achieving the double, or treble if they were also the league leaders.)	46–8	Bradford Thunderbirds	Featherstone Rovers	
2013	Thatto Heath St Helens (T)	36–6	Bradford Thunderbirds	Thatto Heath St Helens	
2014	Thatto Heath St Helens (D)	36–14	Bradford Thunderbirds	Bradford Thunderbirds	
2015	Thatto Heath St Helens (D)	18–12	Featherstone Rovers	Featherstone Rovers	
2016	Thatto Heath St Helens (T)	36–8	Bradford Bulls	Thatto Heath St Helens	

== Seasons ==
=== 2012 ===
In the 2012 season, the teams were divided into four groups; the Premier, the Yorkshire and North East, the North West, and the Southern Division. This was a similar format to the Women's Rugby League Conference from which teams qualified for national play-offs. There were six teams in the Premier Division; Bradford Thunderbirds, Castleford Panthers, Coventry Bears, Featherstone Rovers, Nottingham Outlaws, and Warrington Wolves. The two northern divisions had seven teams each and the southern division had five teams; Guildford Giants, Hemel Stags, The Royal Navy, Southampton Spitfires and West London Sharks. Featherstone finished top of the Premier Division and defeated Bradford 46–8 to win the Championship final. The minor finals were won by teams from the North West Division; Leigh East won the Bowl and Leigh Miners Rangers won the Plate. The finals were held at the Stobart Stadium in Widnes. Charlotte Foley of Wigan St Patricks was named as player of the year based on having received the most player of the match nominations throughout the season.

==== 2012 play-offs ====
Semifinals
P1	Featherstone Rovers	46
P2	Warrington Wolves	0
P3	Bradford Thunderbirds	34
NW1	Widnes Vikings	4

Finals
Featherstone Rovers	46
Bradford Thunderbirds	8

Source: (Note: The play-offs for the 2012 Championship had four rounds, but as not all fixtures are known only the semi-finals and final are shown.)

=== 2013 ===
The league was restructured in 2013 into a Premier Division and Division One. Five teams took part in the Premier Division; Bradford Thunderbirds, Coventry Bears, Featherstone Rovers, Normanton Knights and Thatto Heath. There were 12 teams in Division One; Brighouse, Castleford Panthers, Chorley Panthers, Crosfields, Hunslet Hawks, Leigh East, Leigh Miners Rangers, Oulton Raidettes, Stanningley, West Craven Warriors, Whinmoor and Wigan St Patricks. The Championship was won by Thatto Heath and Leigh East won Division One.

==== 2013 Play-offs ====
Round 1
Thatto Heath	48
Bradford Thunderbirds	18
Featherstone Rovers	0
Normanton Knights	24

Round 2
Bradford Thunderbirds	32
Normanton Knights	12

Final
Thatto Heath	32
Bradford Thunderbirds	6

=== 2014 ===
In 2014, five teams took part in the Premier Division; Bradford Thunderbirds, Crosfields, Featherstone Rovers, Normanton Knights and Thatto Heath. It was won by Thatto Heath who defeated Bradford 36–14 in the play-off final. There were 11 teams in Division One; Brighouse Rangers, Fryston Warriors, Hunslet Hawks, Leigh Miners Rangers, Oulton Raidettes, Rochdale Hornets, Selby Warriors, Stanningley, West Craven Warriors, Whinmoor Warriors and Wigan St Patricks. Division One was won by Stanningley.

==== 2014 Play-offs ====
Round 1
Bradford Thunderbirds	24
Thatto Heath	10
Featherstone Rovers	44
Normanton Knights	12

Round 2
Thatto Heath	34
Featherstone Rovers	12

Final
Bradford Thunderbirds	14
Thatto Heath	36

=== 2015 ===
The 2015 season began on 12 April with 13 teams in the Premier Division; Bradford Thunderbirds, Brighouse Rangers, Featherstone Rovers, Hunslet Hawks, Leigh Miners Rangers, Normanton Knights, Oulton Raidettes, Rochdale Hornets, Selby Warriors, Stanningley, Thatto Heath, West Craven Warriors and Wigan St Patricks. However, several fixtures were postponed and by early July the league table showed that Hunslet Hawks had forfeited their remaining fixtures. By the end of the regular season Rochdale Hornets were also unable to play giving West Craven a bye in the first round of the play-offs. In the play-offs the top four competed for the championship, the next four for the shield and the remaining teams for the plate. Featherstone, the league leaders, lost to second-place Thatto Heath in the first round but then defeated Bradford to set up a rematch with Thatto Heath in the Grand Final. On 4 October, Thatto Heath won 18–12 in the final with the Shield going to Wigan St Patricks and Leigh taking the Plate.

==== 2015 Play-offs ====
Round 1
Featherstone Rovers	4
Thatto Heath	24
Bradford Thunderbirds	56
Stanningley	30

Round 2
Featherstone Rovers	26
Bradford Thunderbirds	14

Final
Thatto Heath	18
Featherstone Rovers	12

=== 2016 ===
The 2016 season started on 3 April with a change to the format so that the twelve competing teams were split into two groups after five matches. Bradford Bulls, who replaced the Bradford Thunderbirds, were top of the table on 15 May and were joined by, Featherstone Rovers, Normanton Knights, Stanningley, Thatto Heath and Wigan St Patricks in Group 1. Brighouse Rangers, Leigh Miners Rangers, Lindley Swifts, Oulton Raidettes, Rochdale Hornets and Selby Warriors were in Group 2. The top four from each group then progressed to the play-offs. Group 1 league leaders Thatto Heath defeated fourth place Stanningley in the semi-final and retained their title on 1 October with a 36–8 win over Bradford Bulls in the Grand Final. In Group 2 Leigh topped the league and went on to win the final 20–12 against Oulton.

==== 2016 Play-offs ====
Semifinals
1	Thatto Heath	24
4	Stanningley	0
2	Featherstone Rovers	28
3	Bradford Bulls	30

Finals
Thatto Heath	36
Bradford Bulls	8

=== 2017 ===
The 2017 season began on 12 March with 11 teams in the Premier Division: Barrow, Batley Bulldogs, Bradford Bulls, Castleford Tigers, Featherstone Rovers, Leigh Miners Rangers, Oulton Raidettes, Stanningley, Thatto Heath, Wakefield Trinity and Wigan St Patricks. The season was left unfinished with last recorded match played on 9 July between Wigan and Barrow. At that time Castleford were top of the table having won seven matches, but were the only team to have played all ten rounds, whereas Featherstone had won six of their eight matches and Bradford had won all five of their completed fixtures. The County Cup finals were played the following weekend and after these the league was replaced by the Super League and the Championship which both started on 23 July.

== See also ==
- Women's Rugby League Conference
- Women's rugby league
- Women's Rugby League World Cup
- RFL Women's Challenge Cup
