= Women's Rugby League Conference =

Rugby league for female teams

- Sport: Rugby league
- Instituted: 2008
- Ceased: 2011
- Replaced by: RFL Women's Rugby League
- Number of teams: 28
- Country: England
- Champions: Warrington (2011)

The Women's Rugby League Conference was a competition for women's rugby league teams in Britain that ran from 2008 to 2011. It ran alongside the equivalent men's competition, the Rugby League Conference.

== History ==
The Rugby League Conference, which ran men's competitions between March and September, was established in 1998 and expanded to cover the whole of Great Britain. The first Women's Rugby League Conference began in 2008 and operated using a similar model of regional divisions.

In 2011, the RFL held meetings with women's clubs in Yorkshire and the North West to discuss the establishment of the RFL Women's Rugby League which would begin in March 2012.

== Competing teams by season ==
In 2009 the following teams played in the Conference:

- National Division: Bradford Thunderbirds, Copeland Wildcats, Coventry Bears, Nottingham Outlaws, Wakefield Panthers, West London Sharks
- North West Division: Chorley Panthers, Halton, Hillside Hawks, Macclesfield, Warrington Wolves
- Yorkshire Division: Bradford Dudley Hill, Brighouse, Keighley Cats, Leeds Akkies, Stanningley

2010 structure:

- East Division: Keighley Cats, Leeds Akkies, Guiseley, Stanningley, Whinmoor, New Earswick All Blacks
- South Division: Coventry Bears, Northampton Demons, Nottingham Outlaws, West London Sharks
- West Division: Chorley Panthers, Warrington, Wigan

2011 structure:

- Central Division: Bradford Thunderbirds, Brighouse Ladies, Dudley Hill Diamonds, Keighley Cats, West Craven Warriors
- North East Division: Featherstone Rovers, Hunslet Hawks, Peterlee Pumas, Leeds Akkies, Stanningley, Whinmoor
- North West Division: Chorley Panthers, Leigh East, Leigh Miners Rangers, Mancunians RL, Pendle Phoenix, Wigan Ladies
- South Division: Coventry Bears, Nottingham Outlaws, Royal Air Force, Royal Navy, The Army, West London Sharks
- West Division: Crosfields, Halton, Macclesfield, Warrington, Widnes Moorfield

== Finals ==
Championship finals
Season	Champions	Score	Runners-up	Ref.
2008	West London Sharks	44–20	Coventry Bears	
2009	Bradford Thunderbirds	44–8	Coventry Bears	
2010	Keighley Cats	18–14	Stanningley	
2011	Warrington Wolves	44–8	Halton Hillside Hawks	

Plate finals
Season	Winners	Score	Runners-up	Ref.
2010	Coventry Bears	30–8	Leeds Akkies	
2011	Leeds Akkies	32–26	Stanningley	

== See also ==
- Women's Challenge Cup
- Women's Super League
