= Amy Hardcastle =

England international rugby league player

Personal information
- Full name: Amy Hardcastle
- Born: 4 March 1989 (age 37) Halifax, West Yorkshire, England

Playing information
- Position: Centre
Club
Years	Team	Pld	T	G	FG	P
2009–20	Bradford Bulls
2020–22	St Helens	14	27	0	0	108
2023–24	Leeds Rhinos	32	28	0	0	112
2025–	St Helens	27	12	0	0	48
	Total	73	67	0	0	268
Representative
Years	Team	Pld	T	G	FG	P
2009–26	England	29	30	0	0	120
	Yorkshire
- Source: As of 10 October 2026

Amy Hardcastle (born 4 March 1989) is an English rugby league player who plays at centre for St Helens in the Betfred Women's Super League.

== Playing career ==
=== Bradford Bulls ===
Born in Halifax, West Yorkshire, Hardcastle first played rugby league for Siddal before taking time away from the game after having her daughter. On her return Siddal had disbanded their women's team so Hardcastle joined Bradford Bulls. Over the next 10 years Hardcastle experienced considerable success as Bradford won the league title twice and the Challenge Cup once.

=== St Helens ===
In 2020 Hardcastle left Bradford to join St Helens but did not make her first appearance for St Helens until 2021 as the 2020 season was cancelled due to the COVID-19 pandemic. In her first full season with St Helens, Hardcastle scored 23 tries in just 13 appearances.

When the NRL named its women's team of the decade in 2020, Hardcastle was the only English player to feature in the team.

In November 2023, Hardcastle became the Women's and Girls Rugby League Development Officer at Halifax Panthers.

=== Leeds Rhinos ===
Hardcastle joined Leeds Rhinos for two seasons in 2023 and 2024. In 32 appearances she scored 28 tries.

=== St Helens (rejoin) ===
On 8 November 2024 Hardcastle re-signed for St Helens

=== Representative ===
Hardcastle was first selected for the England national team in 2009 and played in both the 2013 and 2017 World Cup competitions. Hardcastle announced her retirement from international competition in September 2026 having made 29 appearances for England, scoring 30 tries.

Hardcastle has also represented Yorkshire in Origin Series matches against Lancashire.

== Coaching ==
In October 2027 Hardcastle was appointed as head coach on Bradford Bulls in the women's Championship. She will undertake this role alongside playing for St Helens.

== Personal life ==
Hardcastle was previously a healthcare assistant in the accident & emergency department at the Royal Halifax Infirmary.
