= Women's Challenge Cup =

Women's rugby league competition

- Current season or competition: 2026 Women's Challenge Cup
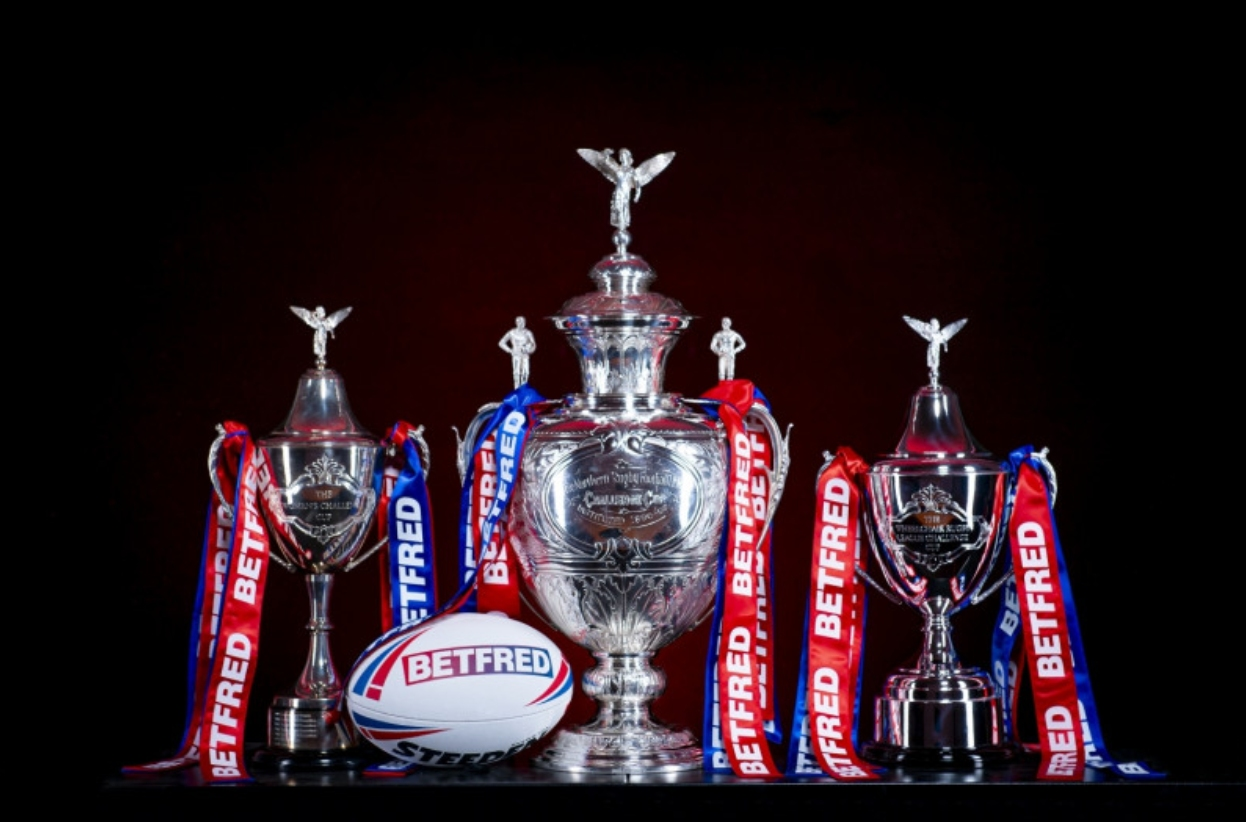
- The women's, men's, and wheelchair Challenge Cup trophies
- Sport: Rugby league
- Instituted: 2012
- Inaugural season: 2012
- Country: England; Wales
- Winners: Wigan Warriors (2026)
- Most titles: St Helens (8 titles)
- Website: Women's Challenge Cup
- Broadcast partner: BBC
- Related competition: Women's Super League; Women's Championship

The Women's Challenge Cup is a rugby league knockout competition organised by the Rugby Football League. The competition started in 2012.

== History ==
=== 2012–2016: Foundations ===
The Rugby Football League's Women's Challenge Cup was set up in 2012 (Note: The Women's Amateur Rugby League Association also ran a Women's Challenge Cup. The first final was played in January 1989, and after 2012 it continued to run alongside the RFL's cup competition until the Women's Winter League was discontinued in 2026.) to run alongside the men's competition to give women's rugby teams more competitive games and to give the sport a bigger profile by attaching it to the Challenge Cup. Most teams in the first few years were community clubs and had no links to professional men's clubs. In 2014 the RFL set up an amateur league for the women's game, to help more women's teams get regular game time.

=== 2017–2020: Exposure ===
In 2018 the competition started to receive a much higher profile, with the final being broadcast live on the BBC Sport website. In 2019 bookmakers Coral agreed to sponsor the competition – in addition to their sponsorship of the men's Challenge Cup – and it was also announced that the final of the 2019 Cup would be played as part of a triple-header with the semi-finals of the men's 2019 Challenge Cup at the University of Bolton Stadium on 27 July 2019. The 2019 competition also saw the introduction of a new trophy commissioned by the RFL. In 2020, the competition was suspended after the first round and later cancelled due to the COVID-19 pandemic.

=== 2021–present: Restructuring ===
In the 2021 competition, entry was restricted to the ten teams in the Super League. The following year the competition expanded to 16 teams (12 Super League, three Championship and one Super League South) and a group stage was introduced with the top two teams from the four groups advancing to the quarter-final stage. The competition was reduced to 12 teams in 2025.

== Finals ==
List of finals
Year	Winning team	Score	Losing team	Venue	Ref.
2012	Featherstone Rovers	46–0	Bradford Thunderbirds	Crown Flatt	
2013	Thatto Heath Crusaders	54–12	Bradford Thunderbirds	Mount Pleasant	
2014	Thatto Heath Crusaders	32–24	Bradford Thunderbirds	Crown Flatt	
2015	Thatto Heath Crusaders	22–6	Featherstone Rovers	Odsal Stadium	
2016	Thatto Heath Crusaders	62–6	Leigh Miners Rangers	Odsal Stadium	
2017	Bradford Bulls	50–16	Featherstone Rovers	Elmpark Way	
2018	Leeds Rhinos	20–14	Castleford Tigers	Halliwell Jones Stadium	
2019	Leeds Rhinos	16–10	Castleford Tigers	University of Bolton Stadium	
2020	Tournament cancelled due to COVID-19 pandemic				
2021	St Helens	34–6	York City Knights	Leigh Sports Village	
2022	St Helens	18–8	Leeds Rhinos	Elland Road	
2023	St Helens	22–8	Leeds Rhinos	Wembley Stadium	
2024	St Helens	22–0	Leeds Rhinos	Wembley Stadium	
2025	Wigan Warriors	42–6	St Helens	Wembley Stadium	
2026	Wigan Warriors	54–6	St Helens	Wembley Stadium	

=== List of teams by number of wins ===
List of teams by number of wins
	Club	Wins	Runners up	Winners	Runners up
1	St Helens (Note: as Thatto Heath (2013–2016))	8	2	2013, 2014, 2015, 2016, 2021, 2022, 2023, 2024	2025, 2026
2	Leeds Rhinos	2	3	2018, 2019	2022, 2023, 2024
3	Wigan Warriors	2	0	2025, 2026	
4	Bradford Bulls (Note: as Bradford Thunderbirds (up to 2015))	1	3	2017	2012, 2013, 2014
5	Featherstone Rovers	1	2	2012	2015, 2017
6	Castleford Tigers	0	2		2018, 2019
7	Leigh Miners Rangers	0	1		2016
7	York City Knights	0	1		2021

== Challenge Shield ==
Between 2012 and 2019 teams that were knocked out of the cup in the early rounds went on to compete in the Challenge Shield competition. In 2021, with entry to the Challenge Cup restricted, the Rugby Football League launched a Women's League Cup for teams outside of the Super League and Championship. In 2022, the League Cup was opened to teams from the Championship, with the two sides that did not progress from the group stage of the Challenge Cup entering the League Cup at the quarter-final round. In 2024, the League Cup also included a League Plate competition and these were renamed as the Challenge Shield and Challenge Plate in 2025.

List of finals
Year	Winning team	Score	Losing team	Ref.
2012	Widnes Vikings	40–10	Stanningley	
2013	Normanton Knights	34–14	Featherstone Rovers	
2014	Featherstone Rovers	64–14	Stanningley	
2015	unknown			
2016	Thatto Heath Crusaders Reserves	62–6	Whitley Bay Barbarians	
2017	York City Knights	26–24	Army	
2018	Bradford Bulls	44–16	Stanningley	
2019	Army	40–4	York City Knights	

== Sponsorship ==
Year	Sponsor	Name
2019–2020	Coral	Coral Women's Challenge Cup
2021–present	Betfred	Betfred Women's Challenge Cup

== See also ==
- Double (rugby league)
- Treble (rugby league)
- Wheelchair Challenge Cup
