= Stanningley SARLFC =

English amateur rugby league club

Stanningley

Club information
- Full name: Stanningley Sports and Amateur Rugby League Football Club
- Colours: Black and White
- Founded: 1889; 137 years ago
- Website: Official Club Website

Current details
- Ground: Arthur Miller Stadium (2,000)
- Coach: Ash Golding
- Competition: National League One

Stanningley S.A.R.L.F.C. is an amateur rugby league football club based in Stanningley, Leeds. The first team plays in National League One of the National Community Rugby League.

Stanningley run two men's senior teams, the first XIII play in the National Conference League while the second XIII play in the Yorkshire Men's League. The clubs also run a women's team and boys and girls teams at all ages.

== Challenge Cup results ==
| Season | Round | Home | Score | Away | Venue |
|---|---|---|---|---|---|
| 1955–56 | Round 1 | Rochdale Hornets | 55–0 | Stanningley | Athletic Ground |
| 1963–64 | Round 1 | Featherstone Rovers | 60–4 | Stanningley | Post Office Road |
| 1997 | Round 1 | Lock Lane | 15–6 | Stanningley | Lock Lane Sports Centre |
| 1998 | Round 1 | Stanningley | 50–16 | Nottingham Crusaders | Arthur Miller Stadium |
| 1998 | Round 2 | Stanningley | 10–37 | Farnworth | Arthur Miller Stadium |
| 2005 | Qualifier | Huddersfield Sharks | 14–19 | Stanningley | |
| 2005 | Round 1 | Illingworth | 20–18 | Stanningley | |
| 2005 | Round 1 | Stanningley | 40–16 | Walney | Arthur Miller Stadium |
| 2005 | Round 2 | Rochdale Mayfield | 14–19 | Stanningley | Springhill |
| 2005 | Round 3 | Doncaster | 54–6 | Stanningley | Tattersfield |
| 2007 | Round 1 | Stanningley | 20–26 | Leigh East | Arthur Miller Stadium |
| 2008 | Round 1 | Stanningley | 16–10 | Shaw Cross | Arthur Miller Stadium |
| 2008 | Round 2 | Warrington Wizards | 26–10 | Stanningley | Monk Sports Club |
| 2010 | Round 1 | Stanningley | 0–22 | Wigan St Judes | Arthur Miller Stadium |
| 2011 | Round 1 | Fryston Warriors | 4–30 | Stanningley | Miners Welfare Recreation Ground |
| 2016 | Round 1 | Stanningley | 16–28 | Pilkington Recs | Arthur Miller Stadium |
| 2019 | Round 1 | Thatto Heath Crusaders | 32–6 | Stanningley | Crusaders Park |
| 2020 | Round 1 | Leigh Miners Rangers | 28–26 | Stanningley | Twist Lane |
| 2022 | Round 1 | Bentley | 16–22 | Stanningley | Brunel Road |
| 2022 | Round 2 | Hunslet Parkside | 22–12 | Stanningley | The Oval |
| 2023 | Round 1 | Stanningley | 38–4 | Milford | Arthur Miller Stadium |
| 2023 | Round 2 | Fryston Warriors | 12–28 | Stanningley | Miners Welfare Recreation Ground |
| 2023 | Round 3 | Stanningley | 16–58 | Newcastle Thunder | Arthur Miller Stadium |
| 2024 | Round 1 | South Wales Jets | 4–40 | Stanningley | Eugene across Park |
| 2024 | Round 2 | Leigh Miners Rangers | 18–19 | Stanningley | Twist Lane |
| 2024 | Round 3 | Stanningley | 4–30 | Wath Brow Hornets | Arthur Miller Stadium |
| 2026 | Round 1 | Stanningley | 24—22 | Dewsbury Moor | Arthur Miller Stadium |
| 2026 | Round 2 | Stanningley | 0—44 | Hunslet | Arthur Miller Stadium |

== Famous players ==
These including England captain Jamie Peacock, Jamie Jones-Buchanan, Tom Johnstone, Ryan Atkins, Ash Gibson, Jordan Lilley, Ashton Golding, Garreth Carvell, Michael Banks, Andy Bastow, Steve Nicholson, Mark Wilson and Roy Dickinson. Danika Priim represented England whilst at Stanningley.

== Ground ==
The club plays home games at the Arthur Miller Stadium which has a capacity of 2,000 and clubhouse that was built in 2001 includes a players lounge, bar and club room as well as numerous changing facilities.

The Arthur Miller Stadium also hosts Leeds Rhinos academy and scholarship teams and has previously been the home of Bramley Buffaloes between 2004 and 2019.

== Women's team ==
The Stanningley women's team was established in 2007. They initially played as a development team due to lack of players, but after three seasons they reached the 2010 Women's Rugby League Conference Championship Grand Final which they lost to Keighley Cats 18–14 in golden point overtime. In the 2011 season, they won the Women's Amateur Rugby League Association's Plate Final. before committing to play in summer-based competitions. They were runners-up in the Challenge Shield three times (2012, 2014 and 2018) and won RFL Women's Rugby League Division 1 in 2014 and the RFL Women's Championship in 2017 and 2018. In 2023, Stanningley were runners-up in the League Cup.

== See also ==
- National Conference League
- Leeds Rhinos
- Bramley Buffaloes
