= Leigh Miners Rangers =

English amateur rugby league club

Club information
- Full name: Leigh Miners Rangers; Amateur Rugby League Football Club
- Nickname(s): Miners, Rangers
- Colours: Black and Yellow
- Founded: 1966; 60 years ago

Current details
- Ground: Twist Lane (A578), Leigh, Greater Manchester.
- Competition: National Conference League

Leigh Miners Rangers are a community amateur rugby league football club from Leigh in the Metropolitan Borough of Wigan, Greater Manchester. The club currently competes in the National Conference League, the National Conference Premier Division. The club also operates an A team, Masters, an Under 18's team, and numerous junior teams. In 2022, Miners Rangers also fielded a Ladies side in the RFL Women's Super League Group 2.

The club was founded in 1966 as Leigh Miners Welfare. The club later merged with the junior club Leigh Rangers, and changed its name to Leigh Miners Rangers.

The club have defeated professional opposition twice in the Challenge Cup. They won 18–12 against Bramley in the third round of the 1999 Challenge Cup, and defeated Oxford 32–6 in the fourth round of the 2015 Challenge Cup.

The club's junior section has produced lots of players who went on to play rugby league professionally, most notably former internationals Denis Betts, Darren Wright, Tommy Martyn, Scott Naylor, Steve Blakeley, Mickey Higham, Paul Rowley and Stuart Littler.

== Women's team ==
In 2016, the women's team reached the final of the Challenge Cup. In 2021, they won the Championship and were accepted into Group 2 of the Women's Super League in 2022. They finished fifth in their league. In October 2022 it was announced that the team would merge with Leigh Leopards and continue to compete in the Super League from 2023 under their rebranded name. The Leigh Miners Rangers community team, which played in League 2 in the 2022 season, continued to take part in the lower tiers of the league competition and competed in League 1 in the 2024 season.

== Honours ==
- National Conference League Premier Division Grand Final
  - Winners (1): 2015
- National Conference League Premier Division
  - Winners (2): 2004–05, 2015
- Conference Challenge Trophy
  - Winners (3): 2012, 2013, 2015
- BARLA National Cup
  - Winners (2): 1973–74, 1982–83
- BARLA Lancashire Cup
  - Winners (4): 1975–76, 1978–79, 1981–82, 1987–88
