= Featherstone Rovers Women =

English women's rugby league club

Club information
- Full name: Featherstone Rovers Rugby League Football Club
- Colours: Blue and White
- Founded: 2011; 15 years ago

Current details
- Ground: Post Office Road, Featherstone, West Yorkshire
- Competition: RFL Women's Super League
- 2026: 2nd in Shield (6th overall)
- Current season

Records
- Challenge Cup: 1 (2012)

Featherstone Rovers Women are the women's rugby league team of Featherstone Rovers in Featherstone, West Yorkshire, England. They play their home games at Post Office Road which is also home to the men's team. They played in the RFL Women's Super League from its inaugural season in 2017 until 2024 when they were relegated to the RFL Women's Championship. In 2025, they won the Northern Championship to earn promotion back to the Super League.

== History ==
The women's team of Featherstone Rovers was founded in 2011 and initially competed in the Women's Rugby League Conference. The club, which had previously been Wakefield Panthers, included numerous England internationals and were one of the most successful women's teams of the previous twenty years having won the Women's Amateur Rugby League Association Challenge Cup 14 times between 1991 and 2007. They won the cup again in 2011 in their first season as Featherstone Rovers. In 2012, Featherstone won the inaugural RFL Women's Challenge Cup defeating Bradford Thunderbirds 46–0 in the final. They also finished top of the Premier Division and defeated Bradford 46–8 in the Championship play-off final. In 2013, they reached the final of the Challenge Shield but lost 16–34 to Normanton Knights. The following season they won the Challenge Shield with a 64–14 win against Stanningley in the final. In the RFL Women's Rugby League, Featherstone finished top of the league in 2015 and also reached the final of the Challenge Cup in the same season.

In 2017, they were one of the four teams to take part in the first season of the RFL Women's Super League and were runners-up in the Grand Final to Bradford Bulls, who also defeated Featherstone in final of the 2017 Challenge Cup. In 2021, when the Super League split part way through the season, Featherstone finished top of group two, but lost 24–22 to Huddersfield Giants in the Shield final. Featherstone reached the Shield final again in 2022, but lost 34–6 to Warrington Wolves. In 2023, they won the group two League Leaders' Shield on the final day of the regular season with a 28–18 win over Salford Red Devils that saw them overtake Barrow Raiders on points difference and earn promotion to the 2024 Super League. The promotion led to Marie Colley being nominated for the Women's Super League Coach of the Year award, but she lost out to former Featherstone player Lindsay Anfield of York Valkyrie. Featherstone began their 2024 season with a win over Sheffield Eagles in the Challenge Cup and qualified for the quarter-finals. This was followed by an unsuccessful league campaign in which they lost every match to finish bottom of the table. They lost in a play-off against Leigh Leopards to be relegated to the Championship for the 2025 season. In the 2025 season, Featherstone defeated London Broncos 20–10 in the Northern Championship Grand Final to return to the Super League.

In December 2025, the Featherstone Rovers club went into administration and in January 2026 the men's team were denied entry to the 2026 RFL Championship. Following negotiations with the Rugby Football League, the decision was made for the women's team to continue to use the Post Office Road ground for the 2026 season in which they were drawn at home against Wigan Warriors in their opening fixture of the Challenge Cup. Losses against the defending champions and at Cardiff Demons saw them exit the cup at the group stage. In the Super League, Featherstone were in seventh place at the mid-season split and went on to finish second in the Shield Competition.

== Players ==
=== Internationals ===
Players who earned international caps while playing for Featherstone Rovers:

- England:
  - Kayleigh Bulman
  - Brogan Churm
  - Katie Cooper-Birkenhead
  - Andrea Dobson
  - Sarah Dunn
  - Kim Field
  - Natalie Gilmour
  - Natalie Harrowell
  - Sinead Peach
  - Emily Rudge
  - Emma Slowe
  - Danielle Titterington
  - Gemma Walsh
- Ireland:
  - Fran Copley
  - Gabby Harrison
- Jamaica
  - Kaya-Jo Laing
- Scotland:
  - Cerys Gregory
  - Bella Kendrick-Naylor
- Wales:
  - Ashlea Prescott

== Seasons ==
Season	League									Play-offs	Challenge Cup	Ref.
Season	Division	P	W	D	L	F	A	Pts	Pos	Play-offs	Challenge Cup	Ref.
2012	Premier	13	Unknown					26	1st	Won in Final	W	
2013	Premier	11	6	0	5	237	278	12	3rd	Lost in Round 1	R2	
2014	Premier	Unknown								Lost in Round 2	R1	
2015	Premier	14	14	0	0	493	95	28	1st	Lost in Grand Final	RU	
2016	Premier	5	4	0	1	208	38	8	3rd	Lost in Semi Final	R2	
2016	Super Six	10	7	1	2	302	156	15	2nd	Lost in Semi Final	R2	
2017	Super League	6	2	0	4	116	208	4	3rd	Lost in Grand Final	RU	
2018	Super League	12	1	0	11	180	461	2	6th	Did not qualify	QF	
2019	Super League	14	6	0	8	237	450	12	5th	Did not qualify	R2	
2020	Super League	Cancelled due to the COVID-19 pandemic										
2021	Super League	8	3	0	5	152	308	6	6th	Did not qualify	QF	
2021	League Shield	4	4	0	0	130	36	8	1st	Lost in Shield Final	QF	
2022	Super League Group 2	12	8	0	4	364	154	16	3rd	Lost in Shield Final	SF	
2023	Super League Group 2	10	8	0	2	356	103	16	1st	Promoted as Champions	GS	
2024	Super League	14	0	0	14	128	606	0	8th	Lost in play-off	QF	
2025	Northern Championship	10	9	0	1	364	56	18	2nd	Won in Grand Final	GS	
2026	Super League	7	1	0	6	44	302	2	7th	—N/a	GS	
2026	Shield (Note: standings carried over from regular season)	13	6	0	7	170	386	12	2nd	Did not qualify	GS	

== Honours ==
- Premier Division:
  - Grand Final: 2012
  - League Leaders: 2012
- Challenge Cup: 2012
- Challenge Shield: 2014
