= Thatto Heath Crusaders =

English amateur rugby league club

Club information
- Full name: Thatto Heath Crusaders ARLFC
- Colours: Black, red and white
- Founded: 1981; 45 years ago
- Website: www.thattoheathcrusaders.org

Current details
- Ground: Crusaders Park, Close Street, Thatto Heath, St Helens, Merseyside, WA9 5JA
- Coach: Mike Woods
- Captain: Jamie Tracey; David Pike; Adam Saunders
- Competition: NCRL National Premier League

Thatto Heath Crusaders is an amateur rugby league club situated in Thatto Heath, St Helens, Merseyside. The club currently competes in the NCRL National Premier League. The Club has 500 registered players, 27 teams from tots to Masters and a strong Girls/Women section making them one of the largest Community Clubs in the UK

== History ==
Thatto Heath RLFC began life in 1981, originally formed by ex-St Helens R.F.C. player Frankie Barrow. The team began competing in the North West Counties 4th Division, and the ‘A’ Team entered Division 5.

The team progressed through the divisions rapidly and finished the 1986−87 season by lifting the North West Counties Premier Division Championship Trophy, the St Helens Cup and they took out the BARLA National Cup Final with a 15–8 victory over the National Conference League Champions Heworth. Captain John McCabe entered the record books as the only player to appear on the winning side in five National Cup Finals.

Over the next 20 years, Thatto Heath enjoyed enormous success, including the National Cup Trophy, a record five County Cups, two Champions Challenge successes, a record seven North West Counties Premier Division titles, two North West Counties Challenge Cups, three North West Counties Premier Challenge Cups and eight St Helens Cups. It was during this period the club recorded their most famous win, against Chorley Chieftains 27−12 in the Silk Cut Challenge Cup third round in January 1996.

Over the years, the club has produced numerous players who have moved on to join the professional ranks including Andy Brown, Gary Forber, Scott Ranson, Stuart Wakefield, Barry Ashall (Swinton), Darren Harris, Paul Bishop, Darren Abram, Gary Sanderson (Warrington), Derrick Seabrook, Steve Dudley (St Helens), Neil Slater (Trafford Borough), Chris Honey (Barrow), Arthur Bradshaw (Salford) and in more recent times Ray Waring, Ste Gee, Mark Gleave and Lydon Smith (Chorley Chieftains). Alex Murphy was also a graduate from the club.

During 1999, the club found themselves without a ground so a merger was proposed with another local rugby league club, St Helens Crusaders (formed 1982 by Danny Rylance), notable players moving on to professional ranks include for example Steve Prescott, Keiron Cunningham, Lee Briers. With the approval of the members at a meeting at SIDAC social club, the club then became Thatto Heath Crusaders – St. Helens with players like James Graham, Kevin Brown, Josh Simm, Jon Dennis on moving into pro ranks.

The club was eventually elected to the National Conference League in 2000–01. Thatto Heath took out the National Conference Division 2 Championship title and national cup that same year.

In 2007, Thatto Heath went up rapidly through the leagues to the championship.

Thatto Heath won the Division One title in 2010 and promotion to the Premiership and in 2011 Thatto Heath went on to win the Conference League Premiership title defeating Siddal in the final. Captained by Mark Beech, Crusaders then went on to become European champions the same year.

In 2015, Thatto Heath were relegated from the Premier Division after finishing 11 from 12 teams, ending their five-year stay in the top flight. Thatto Heath appeared in the playoffs in each of the seasons in the Premier Division (except for 2015), including finishing top of the table in 2011 and 2013. The Club currently has 500 players registered over 27 teams (some age groups with multiple teams) and a thriving Girls / Women section with strong links to pro Clubs. 150 volunteers help administer those players.

In 2017, the club was the recipient of the Queens Award for Voluntary Service.

== Juniors ==
Thatto Heath run a junior team in the Gillette National Youth League.

== Honours ==
- National Conference League Premier Division
  - Winners (3): 2010–11, 2017, 2021
- National Conference League Division One
  - Winners (3): 2002–03, 2009–10, 2016
- National Conference League Division Two
  - Winners (1): 2000–01
- BARLA National Cup
  - Winners (3): 1986–87, 2000–01, 2018–19 (A Team)
- BARLA Lancashire Cup
  - Winners (5): 1988–89, 1989–90, 1992–93, 1996–97, 1999–2000

== Women's team ==
In 2013, the Thatto Heath Crusaders women's side competed in the Women's Rugby League Conference where they finished top of the Premier League and defeated Bradford Thunderbirds 32–6 to win the Grand Final. Following becoming league champions in 2014, 2015 and 2016 the team became founding members of the RFL Women's Super League in 2017. The club also won the Women's Challenge Cup four years in a row from 2013 to 2016. Ahead of the 2018 season, the side were bought out by St Helens R.F.C.

While this meant that they no longer played in the top tier of Women's competition, they continued to field teams in lower leagues under the Thatto Heath Crusaders name. In the 2022 season, the club played in League 2 and in the 2024 season they competed in League 1.

=== Honours ===
- RFL Women's Rugby League:
  - Grand Final (4): 2013, 2014, 2015, 2016
  - League Leaders (1): 2013, 2016
- Women's Challenge Cup (4): 2013, 2014, 2015, 2016
