= 2022 Challenge Cup =

British rugby league knockout tournament

- Duration: 9 rounds
- Number of teams: 63
- Highest attendance: 51,628 (Final – 28 May 2022)
- Lowest attendance: 130; London Skolars vs Hunslet Club Parkside (12 February 2022)
- Average attendance: 2,289
- Aggregate attendance: 141,953
- Broadcast partners: BBC Sport; Our League; Premier Sports; The Sportsman
- Winners: Wigan Warriors (20th title)
- Runners-up: Huddersfield Giants
- Biggest home win: Batley Bulldogs 66–6 Royal Navy (27 February 2022)
- Biggest away win: West Wales Raiders 0–96 Swinton Lions (30 January 2022)
- Lance Todd Trophy: Chris McQueen (Huddersfield Giants)
- Top point-scorer(s): Dan Abram (24)
- Top try-scorer(s): Jordan Gibson (5)

The 2022 Challenge Cup, known for sponsorship reasons as the 2022 Betfred Challenge Cup, was the 121st edition of the Challenge Cup, the main rugby league knockout cup tournament in British rugby league run by the Rugby Football League (RFL). It started on 15 January 2022 and ended, with the final at Tottenham Hotspur Stadium on 28 May.

St Helens were the defending champions going into 2022, but they were eliminated in the semi-final by Wigan Warriors, who went on to win the Final, by narrowly defeating Huddersfield Giants 16-14.

== Background ==
The competition started on 14 January and concluded with the final on 28 May. Traditionally the Challenge Cup final is held at Wembley Stadium in London. Due to scheduling conflicts between Wembley and the RFL due to a BBC request to play the final earlier in the year in May, it was announced that the 2022 Challenge Cup Final would be held at Tottenham Hotspur Stadium in London. The RFL stated that the final would return to Wembley in 2023. The RFL 1895 Cup would also be played for alongside the Challenge Cup.

All professional RFL member clubs were invited to participate as well as a number of invited amateur teams including teams representing the British Armed forces and police forces. This year it was announced that the Super League's Toulouse Olympique, who are not members of the RFL but are invited to take part in the Challenge Cup, had declined their invitation and would not participate. Newly formed Cornwall R.L.F.C. who played in RFL League 1 also decided not to enter the competition.

St Helens were the defending champions going into 2022, however, they were eliminated in the semi final, narrowly losing to Wigan Warriors 18–20.

A new television deal with the BBC came into effect this year, with coverage of more matches of later rounds as well as providing digital coverage of earlier rounds. The Sportsman continued its involvement in streaming games that started in 2021 and the RFL streamed some matches on its own streaming service, Our League. Premier Sports also broadcast a number of cup game as part of the broadcast deal signed with the RFL in October 2021.

=== Format and dates ===
Challenge Cup competition format
Round	Date	Clubs involved this round	Winners from previous round	New entries this round	Leagues entering at this round
Round 1	14–16 January	28	None	28	28 UK based community league teams
Round 2	29–30 January	24	14	10	10 teams from League One (Note: The eleventh League 1 team, Cornwall, declined to take part in the competition)
Round 3	12–13 February	12	12	None	
Round 4	26–28 February	20	6	14	All teams from the Championship
Round 5	12–14 March	10	10	None	
Round 6	25–27 March	16	5	11	11 teams from the Super League (Note: The twelfth SL team, Toulouse, declined to take part in the competition)
Quarter-finals	8–10 April	8	8	None	None
Semi-finals	7 May	4	4	None	None
Final	28 May	2	2	None	None

== First round ==
The draw for the first round was made at the Tottenham Hotspur Stadium, and ties were played over the weekend of 14–16 January 2022.

Challenge Cup round 1 fixtures
Home	Score	Away	Match Information
Home	Score	Away	Date and Time	Venue	Referee	Attendance
Bridgend Blue Bulls	0–60	Royal Navy	14 January 2022, 19:00	Brynglas Field, Pyle	K. Young	—N/a (Note: Attendances for games involving only community clubs are not always recorded)
Orrell St James	10–18	British Army	15 January 2022, 12:30	Bankes Avenue, Orrell	M. Lynn	—N/a
London Chargers	22–16	Ellenborough Rangers	15 January 2022, 13:00	Dukes Meadows, Chiswick	W. Gilder	—N/a
West Hull	46–6	Upton	15 January 2022, 13:30	North Road, Hull	J. Covell-Wood	—N/a
Edinburgh Eagles	24–38	York Acorn	15 January 2022, 13:30	Royal High School, Edinburgh	L. Fenton	—N/a
Thornhill Trojans	24–6	Royal Air Force	15 January 2022, 13:30	Overthorpe Park, Thornhill	S. Ellis	—N/a
Featherstone Lions	6–56	Hunslet Club Parkside	15 January 2022, 14:00	Millpond Stadium, Featherstone	R. Stansfield	—N/a
Jarrow Vikings	10–52	Wests Warriors	15 January 2022, 14:00	Kingston Park, Newcastle	T. Gibbs	—N/a
Lock Lane	18–10	Thatto Heath Crusaders	15 January 2022, 14:00	Lock Lane Sports Centre, Castleford	F. Lincoln	—N/a
Siddal	28–0	Great Britain Police	15 January 2022, 14:00	Exley Lane, Halifax	R. Johnson	—N/a
Rochdale Mayfield	36–22	Wigan St Pats	15 January 2022, 14:15	Mayfield Sports Centre, Rochdale	A. Billington	—N/a
Leigh Miners Rangers	22–20	Milford	15 January 2022, 14:30	Twist Lane, Leigh	R. Cox	—N/a
Galway Tribesmen	10–36	Pilkington Recs	15 January 2022, 14:30	Ruskin Drive, St Helens (Note: Although Galway were drawn at home, under the club's terms of entry into the competition, the game was played at Pilkington Recs.)	D. Arnold	—N/a
Bentley	16–22	Stanningley	16 January 2022, 14:00	Brunel Rd, Cusworth	C. Beevers	—N/a

== Second round ==
The draw for the second round was made at the same time at the first. Ties were played over the weekend of 29–30 January 2022. This round sees sides from the League 1 enter.

Challenge Cup round 2 fixtures
Home	Score	Away	Match Information
Home	Score	Away	Date and Time	Venue	Referee	Attendance
York Acorn	28–10	Wests Warriors	29 January 2022, 13:30	Thanet Road	A. Johnson	250
British Army	10–14 (Note: After golden point extra time.)	Royal Navy	29 January 2022, 14:00	Aldershot Military Stadium	M. Lynn	500
Hunslet Club Parkside	22–12	Stanningley	29 January 2022, 14:00	Hillidge Road	M. Clayton	550
West Hull	16–18	Rochdale Mayfield	29 January 2022, 14:00	West Hull Community Park	A. Sweet	400
Leigh Miners Rangers	8–40	North Wales Crusaders	29 January 2022, 14:30	Twist Lane	K. Moore	—N/a (Note: Attendances for games involving community clubs are not always recorded)
Pilkington Recs	10–32	Siddal	29 January 2022, 14:30	Ruskin Drive	M. Mannifield	300
London Skolars	40–22	London Chargers	29 January 2022, 15:30	New River Stadium	M. Rossleigh	280
Rochdale Hornets	36–16	Midlands Hurricanes	30 January 2022, 13:00	Spotland Stadium	L. Rush	688
Doncaster	24–6	Thornhill	30 January 2022, 15:00	Keepmoat Stadium	L. Bland	618
Hunslet	22–6	Keighley Cougars	30 January 2022, 15:00	South Leeds Stadium	C. Worsley	637
West Wales Raiders	0–96	Swinton Lions	30 January 2022, 15:00	Stebonheath Park	J. Jones	312
Oldham	12–22	Lock Lane	30 January 2022, 18:00	Whitebank Stadium	B. Milligan	361

== Third round ==
The draw for the third round was made on 1 February. Ties were played over the weekend of 12–13 February 2022.

Challenge Cup round 3 fixtures
Home	Score	Away	Match Information
Home	Score	Away	Date and Time	Venue	Referee	Attendance
Rochdale Mayfield	0–20	Doncaster	12 February 2022, 14:00	Mayfield Sports Centre, Rochdale	B. Milligan	420
Lock Lane	12–28	Rochdale Hornets	12 February 2022, 14:30	Lock Lane Sports Centre, Castleford	M. Mannifield	500
London Skolars	6–28	Hunslet Club Parkside	12 February 2022, 15:30	New River Stadium	J. Jones	130
Royal Navy	22–8	York Acorn	12 February 2022, 16:00	United Services Recreation Ground	M. Rossleigh	300
Hunslet	30–4	Siddal	13 February 2022, 13:00	South Leeds Stadium	A. Sweet	651
Swinton Lions	14–20	North Wales Crusaders	13 February 2022, 15:00	Heywood Road	L. Rush	516

== Fourth round ==
The draw for the fourth round was made at the same time at the third. Ties were played over the weekend of 26–28 February 2022. This round saw sides from the Championship enter.

Challenge Cup round 4 fixtures
Home	Score	Away	Match Information
Home	Score	Away	Date and Time	Venue	Referee	Attendance
North Wales Crusaders	30–8	Hunslet	26 February 2022; 14:00	Paton Field	M. Smaill	452
Batley Bulldogs	66–6	Royal Navy	27 February 2022; 13:00	Mount Pleasant	L. Rush	1,271
Doncaster	0–60	Whitehaven	27 February 2022; 14:00	Keepmoat Stadium	M. Rossleigh	544
Hunslet Club Parkside	20–40	Sheffield Eagles	27 February 2022; 14:00	South Leeds Stadium	B. Milligan	450
Workington Town	26–12	Dewsbury Rams	27 February 2022; 14:00	Derwent Park	B. Thaler	872
Halifax Panthers	16–29	Featherstone Rovers	27 February 2022; 15:00	The Mbi Shay	M. Griffiths	1,625
London Broncos	8–34	Bradford Bulls	27 February 2022; 15:00	Plough Lane	N. Bennett	551
Rochdale Hornets	12–38	Barrow Raiders	27 February 2022; 15:00	Spotland Stadium	C. Worsley	515
York City Knights	42–13	Newcastle Thunder	27 February 2022; 15:00	York Community Stadium	S. Mikalauskas	1,221
Leigh Centurions	38–4	Widnes Vikings	28 February 2022; 19:45	Leigh Sports Village	J. Child	2,567

== Fifth round ==
The draw for the fifth round was made on 28 February at the conclusion of the tie between Leigh and Widnes. Ties were played over the weekend of 12–14 March 2022.

Challenge Cup round 5 fixtures
Home	Score	Away	Match Information
Home	Score	Away	Date and Time	Venue	Referee	Attendance
North Wales Crusaders	30–50	Sheffield Eagles	12 March 2022, 13:30	Eirias Stadium	L. Rush	330
Barrow Raiders	32–18	Workington Town	13 March 2022, 13:00	Craven Park	B. Thaler	1,825
Batley Bulldogs	20–54	Featherstone Rovers	13 March 2022, 15:00	Mount Pleasant	J. Vella	1,003
Whitehaven	38–12	York City Knights	13 March 2022, 15:00	Recreation Ground	A. Moore	798
Bradford Bulls	16–20	Leigh Centurions	14 March 2022, 19:45	Odsal Stadium	M. Griffiths	1,221

== Sixth round ==
The draw for the sixth round was made on 14 March 2022, at Elland Road, Leeds. Ties were played over the weekend of 25–27 March 2022.

Challenge Cup round 6 fixtures
Home	Score	Away	Match Information
Home	Score	Away	Date and Time	Venue	Referee	Attendance
Wigan Warriors	20–0	Salford Red Devils	25 March 2022, 19:35	DW Stadium	R. Hicks	6,005
Sheffield Eagles	12–58	Hull FC	26 March 2022, 14:00	Post Office Road (Note: Match to be played at Featherstone due to building works at Sheffield's home ground.)	J. Child	1,039
Whitehaven	4–46	St Helens	26 March 2022, 14:00	Recreation Ground	T. Grant	4,869
Catalans Dragons	27–14	Featherstone Rovers	26 March 2022, 14:30	Stade Gilbert Brutus	C. Kendall	3,624
Hull KR	24–18	Leigh Centurions	26 March 2022, 15:00	Craven Park	A. Moore	3,088
Leeds Rhinos	16–40	Castleford Tigers	26 March 2022, 16:30	Headingley	L. Moore	5,122
Warrington Wolves	12–16	Wakefield Trinity	27 March 2022, 14:00	Halliwell Jones Stadium	J. Smith	2,627
Barrow Raiders	16–30	Huddersfield Giants	27 March 2022, 16:30	Craven Park	M. Griffiths	3,135

== Quarter-finals ==
The draw for the quarter-finals was made during the half-time broadcast of the sixth-round match between Leeds Rhinos and Castleford Tigers. The draw was hosted by Tanya Arnold, and the teams were drawn by Robbie Hunter-Paul, and John Kear. Ties were played over the weekend of 8–10 April 2022.

Home	Score	Away	Match Information
Home	Score	Away	Date and Time	Venue	Referee	Attendance
Hull KR	34–10	Castleford Tigers	8 April 2022, 19:45	Hull College Craven Park	R. Hicks
Catalans Dragons	20–36	St Helens	9 April 2022, 14:30	Stade Gilbert Brutus	C. Kendall	8,624
Huddersfield Giants	24–16	Hull FC	9 April 2022, 17:00	John Smiths Stadium	L. Moore	3,637
Wakefield Trinity	6–36	Wigan Warriors	10 April 2022, 14:30	Be Well Support Stadium	J. Child	3,756

== Semi-finals ==
The draw for the semi-finals was made on 10 April. The ties were both played at Elland Road, Leeds on 7 May. They formed a triple-header with the final of the 2022 Women's Challenge Cup.

Team 1	Score	Team 2	Match Information
Team 1	Score	Team 2	Date and Time	Venue	Referee	Attendance
Wigan Warriors	20–18	St Helens	7 May 2022, 14:30	Elland Road	J. Child	22,141
Huddersfield Giants	25–4	Hull KR	7 May 2022, 17:00	Elland Road	L. Moore	22,141

== Final ==
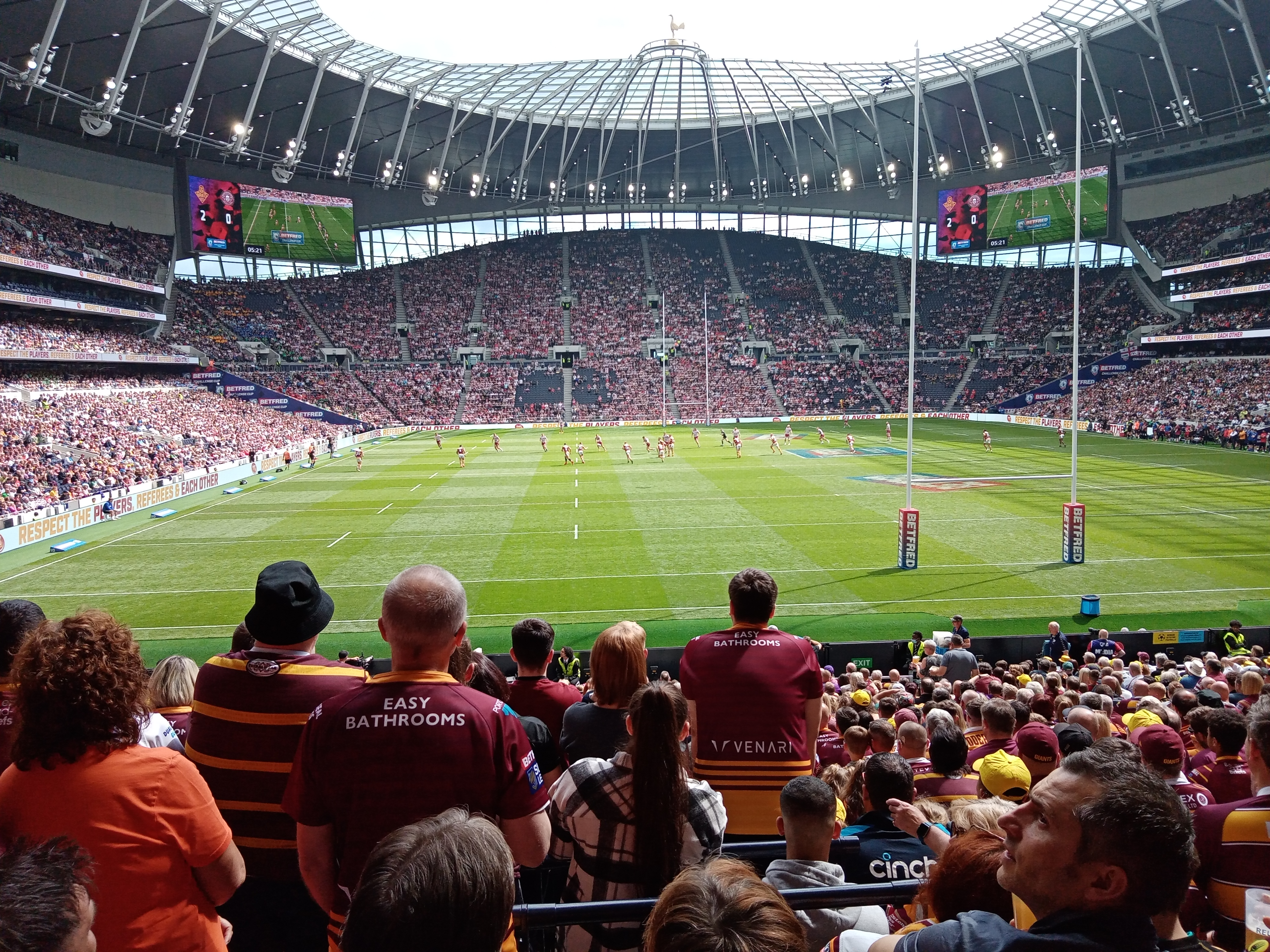
Huddersfield Giants vs Wigan Warriors in the 2022 Challenge Cup Final

The final of the 2022 Challenge Cup took place on 28 May at the Tottenham Hotspur Stadium.

Home	Score	Away	Match Information
Home	Score	Away	Date and Time	Venue	Referee	Attendance
Wigan Warriors	16–14	Huddersfield Giants	28 May 2022, 15:00	Tottenham Hotspur Stadium	James Child	51,628

Huddersfield second row forward, Chris McQueen was named winner of the Lance Todd Trophy.

== Broadcast matches ==
Broadcast matches
Round	Match	Date	Broadcast method
1st	Orrell St James v British Army	15 January 2022	Broadcast live on BBC Red Button and BBC iPlayer
1st	Rochdale Mayfield v Wigan St Patricks	15 January 2022	Streamed live on The Sportsman
1st	Bentley v Stanningley	16 January 2022	Streamed live on Our League
2nd	British Army v Royal Navy	29 January 2022	Streamed live on The Sportsman
2nd	Rochdale Hornets v Midlands Hurricanes	30 January 2022	Broadcast live on BBC Red Button and on BBC iPlayer
2nd	Oldham v Lock Lane	30 January 2022	Streamed live on Our League
3rd	Lock Lane v Rochdale Hornets	12 February 2022	Streamed live on The Sportsman
3rd	Royal Navy v York Acorn	12 February 2022	Streamed live on Our League
3rd	Hunslet v Siddal	13 February 2022	Broadcast live on BBC Red Button and BBC iPlayer
4th	Batley Bulldogs v Royal Navy	27 February 2022	Broadcast live on BBC Sport and on BBC iPlayer
4th	York City Knights v Newcastle Thunder	27 February 2022	Streamed live on The Sportsman
4th	Leigh Centurions v Widnes Vikings	28 February 2022	Broadcast live on Premier Sports
5th	North Wales Crusaders v Sheffield Eagles	12 March 2022	Streamed live on Our League
5th	Barrow Raiders v Workington Town	13 March 2022	Broadcast live on BBC Sport and on BBC iPlayer
5th	Batley Bulldogs v Featherstone Rovers	13 March 2022	Streamed live on The Sportsman
5th	Bradford Bulls v Leigh Centurions	14 March 2022	Broadcast live on Premier Sports
6th	Wigan Warriors v Salford Red Devils	25 March 2022	Streamed live on Premier Sports
6th	Whitehaven v St Helens	26 March 2022	Streamed live on The Sportsman
6th	Leeds Rhinos v Castleford Tigers	26 March 2022	Broadcast live on BBC Two
6th	Warrington Wolves v Wakefield Trinity	27 March 2022	Streamed live on Premier Sports
6th	Barrow Raiders v Huddersfield Giants	27 March 2022	Broadcast live on BBC Two
QF	Hull KR v Castleford Tigers	8 April 2022	Streamed live on Premier Sports
QF	Catalans Dragons v St Helens	9 April 2022	Broadcast live on BBC One
QF	Huddersfield Giants v Hull FC	9 April 2022	Streamed live on Premier Sports
QF	Wakefield Trinity v Wigan Warriors	10 April 2022	Broadcast live on BBC Two
SF	Wigan Warriors v St Helens	7 May 2022	Broadcast live on BBC One
SF	Hull KR v Huddersfield Giants	7 May 2022	Broadcast live on BBC Two
F	Wigan Warriors v Huddersfield Giants	28 May 2022	Broadcast live on BBC One

== See also ==
- 2022 Women's Challenge Cup
