= 2025 Challenge Cup =

British rugby league knockout tournament

- Duration: 7 rounds
- Number of teams: 69
- Highest attendance: 63,278; Warrington Wolves vs Hull KR (7 June 2025)
- Lowest attendance: 518; Sheffield Eagles vs West Bowling (26 January 2025)
- Broadcast partners: BBC Sport; Our League; The Sportsman
- Winners: Hull KR
- Runners-up: Warrington Wolves
- Biggest home win: West Hull 90–0 Edinburgh Eagles (18 January)
- Biggest away win: Wests Warriors 0–92 Leeds Rhinos (8 February)

The 2025 Challenge Cup, known for sponsorship reasons as the 2025 Betfred Challenge Cup, was the 124th staging of the Challenge Cup, the main rugby league knockout cup tournament in British rugby league, run by the Rugby Football League (RFL).

== Background ==
Following discussions in 2024, it was announced that the format was being revised and there would now only be seven rounds of competition, down from the nine rounds used in recent seasons. The changes saw the Championship and League One clubs entering in round 2 (round 3 in 2024), and the Super League clubs entering in round 3 (round 6 in 2024), with all 12 super league teams playing away in round 3. The change followed criticism that the previous format favoured Super League clubs, and reducing the opportunities for smaller clubs to stage a tie against a big club.

The competition started in January 2025, and concluded with the final on 7 June at Wembley Stadium.

Toulouse Olympique declined to take part, as in previous years.

=== Format and dates ===
Challenge Cup competition format
Round	Date	Clubs involved this round	Winners from previous round	New entries this round	Leagues entering at this round
Round 1	11–12 January	34	None	34	34 UK based community teams
Round 2	25–26 January	40	17	23	All teams (except Toulouse) from the Championship (12) and League One (11)
Round 3	8–9 February	32	20	12	All 12 teams from the Super League
Round 4	15–16 March	16	16	None	
Quarter-finals	5–6 April	8	8	None	
Semi-finals	10–11 May	4	4	None	
Final	7 June	2	2	None	

The 34 clubs in the first round comprise:

- the three armed services clubs
- 15 from the National Conference League (NCL)
- one each from the Scottish, Welsh and Irish leagues
- GB Police
- 12 from other English regional leagues (outside the NCL)

== First round ==
The draw for the first and second rounds of the competition were made on 2 December 2024.

Wath Brow Hornets were originally drawn against West Bowling. On 6 January 2025 the Wath Brow club informed the RFL that they would concede the tie, citing "player safety" as the reason. The early rounds of the competition coincide with a period during which full contact training and playing is restricted for amateur teams that play during the summer by the RFL operational rules. Wath Brow considered that the risks to their players were too great to participate in the tie against West Bowling. The RFL invited Cutsyke Raiders to replace Wath Brow. As Cutsyke play during the winter, the club is not affected by the no-contact period.

A majority of the fixtures were postponed from the original weekend of 11/12 January due to bad weather but were rescheduled for the following weekend.

Number of teams per tier remaining in competition at start of round 1
Super League (Note: Super League teams joined the competition in the third round)	Championship (Note: Championship and League One teams joined the competition in the second round)	League One	Non-League	Total
12 / 12	12 / 12	11 / 11	34 / 34	69 / 69

Challenge Cup round 1 fixtures
Home	Score	Away	Match Information
Home	Score	Away	Date and Time	Venue	Referee	Attendance (Note: Attendances not recorded for matches only involving amateur teams)
Waterhead Warriors	12–8 (Note: After golden point extra time)	Leigh Miners Rangers	18 January 2025, 12:30 (Note: Postponed from 11 January)	Peach Road	A. Williams	not recorded
Rochdale Mayfield	64–16	Telford Raiders	18 January 2025, 13:30	Keswick Street	J. Pemberton	not recorded
British Army	22–16	RAF	18 January 2025, 14:00	Aldershot Military Stadium	C. Hughes	not recorded
Crosfields	52–0	Maryport	18 January 2025, 14:00	Hood Lane Recreation Ground	L. O'brien	not recorded
Dewsbury Moor	20–12	Haresfinch	18 January 2025, 14:00	Dewsbury Moor Sports Club	J. Stearne	not recorded
Lock Lane	50–10	Doncaster Toll Bar	18 January 2025, 14:30	Lock Lane Sports Centre	L. Grundy	not recorded
Mirfield	20–26	Royal Navy	18 January 2025, 14:00	Slipper Lane	S. Quarmby	not recorded
Stanley Rangers	20–34	Hunslet ARLFC	18 January 2025, 14:00	Lee Moor Road	O. Taylor	not recorded
West Bowling	48–16	Cutsyke Raiders	18 January 2025, 14:00	Horsfall Stadium		not recorded
West Hull	90–0	Edinburgh Eagles	18 January 2025, 14:00	Johnny Whiteley Park	O. Salmon	not recorded
Ince Rose Bridge	56–12	Longhorns	18 January 2025, 14:30	Pinfold Street	R. Schofield	not recorded
Thatto Heath Crusaders	28–24	Orrell St James	19 January 2025, 14:00	Close St	A. Billington	not recorded
Hammersmith Hills Hoists	4–18	Siddal	11 January 2025, 17:00	Chiswick Rugby Football Club	S. Jenkinson	not recorded
Aberavon Fighting Irish	16–32	Blackbrook	12 January 2025, 13:30	Vivian Park	K. Young	not recorded
GB Police	4–52	York Acorn	19 January 2025, 13:30 (Note: Postponed from 12 January)	Portico Vine ARLFC	T. Jones	not recorded
Eastern Rhinos	4–66	Wests Warriors	12 January 2025, 14:30	Northern Gateway Sports Park	M. McKelvey	not recorded
London Chargers	12–28	Oulton Raiders	18 January 2025, 14:30	Streatham-Croydon RFC	R. Apsee	not recorded

== Second round ==
Number of teams per tier remaining in competition at start of round 2
Super League	Championship	League One	Non-League	Total
12 / 12	12 / 12	11 / 11	17 / 34	52 / 69

Challenge Cup round 2 fixtures
Home	Score	Away	Match Information
Home	Score	Away	Date and Time	Venue	Referee	Attendance
London Broncos	10–17	Goole Vikings	25 January 2025, 12:30	Priory Lane	R. Cox
Dewsbury Moor	6–50	Dewsbury Rams	25 January 2025, 14:00	Mount Pleasant	A. Belafonte	1,252
Hunslet ARLFC	18–24	West Hull	25 January 2025, 14:00	The Oval, Leeds	S. Jenkinson	not recorded
Lock Lane	10–50	Hunslet	25 January 2025, 14:00	Lock Lane Sports Centre	C. Hughes
Featherstone Rovers	88–10	Waterhead Warriors	25 January 2025, 14:00	Post Office Road (Note: Waterhead were drawn at home but agreed to play at Featherstone as their own ground was unusable.)	A. Billington
Wests Warriors	36–18	British Army	25 January 2025, 14:00	Twyford Avenue Sports Ground	M. McKelvey	not recorded
York Acorn	22–2	Oulton Raiders	25 January 2025, 14:00	Thanet Road	J. Hughes	not recorded
Whitehaven	24–12	Swinton Lions	25 January 2025, 15:00	Recreation Ground	S. Mikalauskas	908
Oldham	60–10	Rochdale Mayfield	26 January 2025, 12:30	Boundary Park	W. Turley	1,032
Cornwall	0–52	North Wales Crusaders	26 January 2025, 13:00	The Memorial Ground	A. Williams
Royal Navy	0–56	Workington Town	26 January 2025, 13:00	United Services Recreation Ground	J. Pemberton	not recorded
Blackbrook	12–34	Ince Rose Bridge	26 January 2025, 14:00	Blackbrook Rugby & Recreation Club	M. Clayton	not recorded
Midlands Hurricanes	46–0	Siddal	26 January 2025, 14:00	Alexander Stadium	K. Moore
Barrow Raiders	86–6	Crosfields	26 January 2025, 15:00	Craven Park	S. Houghton	849
Bradford Bulls	30–4	Doncaster	26 January 2025, 15:00	Odsal Stadium	C. Worsley
Halifax Panthers	48–6	Thatto Heath Crusaders	26 January 2025, 15:00	The Shay	D. Arnold	743
Newcastle Thunder	0–54	Batley Bulldogs	26 January 2025, 15:00	Crow Trees Ground	T. Jones
Rochdale Hornets	16–34	Widnes Vikings	26 January 2025, 15:00	Spotland	M. Lynn	866
Sheffield Eagles	62–0	West Bowling	26 January 2025, 15:00	Olympic Legacy Park	A. Sweet	518
Keighley Cougars	12–72	York Knights	2 February 2025, 15:00 (Note: Delayed by one week due to York's commitments in the Amsterdam Challenge)	Cougar Park	M. Lynn

== Third round ==
The draw for the third round took place live on BBC Sport, on 14 January 2025. The draw was made by RFL vice president Danika Priim, and Betfred owner Fred Done.

Ahead of round 3, the integrity of the competition came into question, with the "Super League teams guaranteed to be played away from home" being reversed or moved to neutral venues for every tie between Super League and amateur clubs. This was done on the basis of amateur grounds not meeting the standards for matches involving professional clubs. The RFL was also criticised for failing for foresee this situation arising when the new format was announced.

Number of teams per tier remaining in competition at start of round 3
Super League	Championship	League One	Non-League	Total
12 / 12	11 / 12	6 / 11	4 / 34	33 / 69

Challenge Cup round 3 fixtures
Home	Score	Away	Match Information
Home	Score	Away	Date and Time	Venue	Referee	Attendance
Sheffield Eagles	12–48	Wigan Warriors	7 February 2025, 19:30	Olympic Legacy Park	J. Smith	1,244
Workington Town	0–60	Leigh Leopards	7 February 2025, 19:30	Derwent Park	L. Rush	3,033
York Knights	2–44	Hull KR	7 February 2025, 20:00	York Community Stadium	C. Kendall	5,369
Halifax Panthers	0–14	Catalans Dragons	8 February 2025, 12:00	The Shay	M. Griffiths	806
Wests Warriors	0–92	Leeds Rhinos	8 February 2025, 12:00	Headingley (Note: Wests Warriors were drawn at home but agreed to play at Leeds Rhinos as their own ground was unusable.)	M. Lynn	1,310
West Hull	0–38	St Helens	8 February 2025, 14:00	Craven Park (Note: West Hull were drawn at home but agreed to play at Hull KR as their own ground was unusable.)	S. Mikalauskas	5,500 (est) (Note: No official attendance given but people were admitted without counting to reduce queues at the gates and prevent the start of the game being delayed.)
York Acorn	6–52	Hull FC	8 February 2025, 14:00	Post Office Road (Note: York Acorn were drawn at home but agreed to play at Featherstone as their own ground was unusable.)	W. Turley
Goole Vikings	0–82	Wakefield Trinity	8 February 2025, 15:00	Belle Vue (Note: Match switched to Belle Vue by agreement between the clubs.)	C. Worsley	2,032
Whitehaven	4–44	Warrington Wolves	8 February 2025, 15:00	Recreation Ground	A. Moore	3,980
Bradford Bulls	18–16	Castleford Tigers	9 February 2025, 13:00	Odsal Stadium	L. Moore	2,946
Batley Bulldogs	26–4	Dewsbury Rams	9 February 2025, 14:00	Mount Pleasant	R. Cox
Featherstone Rovers	68–0	Ince Rose Bridge	9 February 2025, 14:00	Post Office Road	A. Sweet
Midlands Hurricanes	10–46	Salford Red Devils	9 February 2025, 14:00	Alexander Stadium	A. Belafonte	985
North Wales Crusaders	20–26	Widnes Vikings	9 February 2025, 14:30	Eirias Stadium	D. Arnold
Hunslet	6–34	Huddersfield Giants	9 February 2025, 15:00	South Leeds Stadium	T. Grant	831
Oldham	42–4	Barrow Raiders	9 February 2025, 15:00	Boundary Park	K. Moore	1,064

== Fourth round ==
The draw for the fourth round took place on Saturday 15 February 2025, live on BBC Two, during half-time of the Super League game between St Helens and Salford Red Devils, on the opening weekend of the 2025 Super League season.

Number of teams per tier remaining in competition at start of round 4
Super League	Championship	League One	Non-League	Total
11 / 12	5 / 12	0 / 11	0 / 34	16 / 69

Challenge Cup round 4 fixtures
Home	Score	Away	Match Information
Home	Score	Away	Date and Time	Venue	Referee	Attendance
Hull KR	40–0	Oldham	14 March 2025, 20:00	Craven Park	T. Grant
Salford Red Devils	26–16	Bradford Bulls	14 March 2025, 20:00	Salford Community Stadium	J. Smith	3,066
St Helens	22–14	Leeds Rhinos	14 March 2025, 20:00	Totally Wicked Stadium	L. Moore	7,531
Catalans Dragons	46–18	Featherstone Rovers	15 March 2025, 17:00	Stade Gilbert Brutus	M. Griffiths
Widnes Vikings	16–26	Warrington Wolves	15 March 2025, 17:00	Halton Stadium	J. Vella	7,011
Wigan Warriors	22–26	Hull FC	15 March 2025, 17:45	Brick Community Stadium	C. Kendall	9,287
Huddersfield Giants	12–22	Wakefield Trinity	16 March 2025, 15:00	John Smiths Stadium	A. Moore	3,195
Leigh Leopards	62–4	Batley Bulldogs	16 March 2025, 15:00	Leigh Sports Village	L. Rush	4,717

== Quarter-finals ==
The draw for the quarter-finals took place on Monday 17 March 2025, live on BBC Radio 5 Live sport.

The attendance of 20,226 at the Hull Derby, was the highest attendance at a cup match outside a final since the 1989 quarter final between Leeds and Widnes. Despite increased attendances at games, the televised games viewing figures were less than hoped for due to competition with the Grand National on Saturday.

Number of teams per tier remaining in competition at start of Quarter finals
Super League	Championship	League One	Non-League	Total
8 / 12	0 / 12	0 / 11	0 / 34	8 / 69

Challenge Cup Quarter Final fixtures
Home	Score	Away	Match Information
Home	Score	Away	Date and Time	Venue	Referee	Attendance
Catalans Dragons	20–12	Salford Red Devils	4 April 2025, 19:00	Stade Gilbert Brutus	A. Moore
Wakefield Trinity	12–20	Leigh Leopards	4 April 2025, 20:00	Belle Vue	J. Smith	6,125
Hull FC	16–32	Hull KR	5 April 2025, 14:30	MKM Stadium	C. Kendall	20,226
Warrington Wolves	20–12	St Helens	6 April 2025, 14:30	Halliwell Jones Stadium	L. Moore	10,114

== Semi-finals ==
The draw for the semi-finals took place on Sunday 6 April 2025, during half time between Warrington Wolves and St Helens live on BBC Two.

Matches were played as part of a double header, alongside the women's semi finals. Saturday's semi-final received a peak television audience of 528,000 accounting for 9.6% of the viewer share, while Sunday's game received 396,000 accounting for 4.5%.

Number of teams per tier remaining in competition at start of semi finals
Super League	Championship	League One	Non-League	Total
4 / 12	0 / 12	0 / 11	0 / 34	4 / 69

Challenge Cup Semi Final fixtures
Home	Score	Away	Match Information
Home	Score	Away	Date and Time	Venue	Referee	Attendance
Hull KR	36–12	Catalans Dragons	10 May 2025, 14:30	York Community Stadium	C. Kendall	8,402
Warrington Wolves	21–14	Leigh Leopards	11 May 2025, 16:15	Totally Wicked Stadium	L. Moore	11,722

== Final ==
The final took place on Saturday 7 June 2025, as part of finals day, alongside the Women's final and the final of the 1895 Cup.

Number of teams per tier remaining in competition at start of final
Super League	Championship	League One	Non-League	Total
2 / 12	0 / 12	0 / 11	0 / 34	2 / 69

Challenge Cup Final
Home	Score	Away	Match Information
Home	Score	Away	Date and Time	Venue	Referee	Attendance
Warrington Wolves	6–8	Hull KR	7 June 2025, 15:00	Wembley Stadium	L. Moore	63,278

== Broadcast matches ==
Broadcast matches
Round	Match	Date	Broadcast method
1st	British Army v RAF	18 January	Broadcast live on BFBS.
1st	Waterhead Warriors v Leigh Miners Rangers	18 January	Broadcast live on BBC Red Button.
1st	Thatto Heath Crusaders v Orrell St James	19 January	Streamed live on The Sportsman.
2nd	London Broncos v Goole Vikings	25 January	Broadcast live on BBC Red Button.
2nd	Royal Navy vs Workington Town	26 January	Broadcast live on BFBS.
2nd	Keighley Cougars v York Knights	2 February	Streamed live on The Sportsman.
3rd	York Knights v Hull KR	7 February	Streamed live on The Sportsman.
3rd	Halifax Panthers v Catalans Dragons	8 February	Streamed live on The Sportsman.
3rd	Bradford Bulls v Castleford Tigers	9 February	Broadcast live on BBC Red Button.
4th	St Helens v Leeds Rhinos	14 March	Streamed live on The Sportsman.
4th	Wigan Warriors v Hull FC	15 March	Broadcast live on BBC Red Button.
QF	Wakefield Trinity vs Leigh Leopards	4 April	Streamed live on SuperLeague+
QF	Hull FC vs Hull KR	5 April	Broadcast live on BBC One
QF	Warrington Wolves vs St Helens	6 April	Broadcast live on BBC Two
