= 2020 Challenge Cup =

British rugby league knockout tournament

- Duration: 9 Rounds
- Number of teams: 80
- Highest attendance: 3,112 (Note: All games from the sixth round onwards were played behind closed doors due to COVID-19 restrictions) Wakefield Trinity v Bradford Bulls; 5th round (13 March 2020)
- Lowest attendance: 50 West Wales Raiders v Underbank Rangers; 3rd round (9 February 2020)
- Aggregate attendance: 12,784
- Broadcast partners: BBC Sport; Sky Sports; Fox League
- Winners: Leeds Rhinos
- Runners-up: Salford Red Devils
- Biggest home win: Barrow Island 84–6 Rhondda Outlaws (1st round) 11 January 2020)
- Biggest away win: Rochdale Mayfield 6–64 North Wales Crusaders; 3rd round (8 February 2020)
- Lance Todd Trophy: Richie Myler (Leeds Rhinos)
- Top point-scorer(s): 44, Sam Freeman; Rochdale Hornets (2 tries, 18 goals)
- Top try-scorer(s): 6, Mike Butt; Swinton Lions

The 2020 Challenge Cup, known as the Coral Challenge Cup for sponsorship reasons, was the 119th staging of the Challenge Cup, the main rugby league knockout tournament for teams in the Super League, the British national leagues and a number of invited amateur clubs.

The competition was won by Leeds Rhinos who beat Salford Red Devils 17–16 at Wembley Stadium on 17 October 2020.

Defending champions Warrington Wolves who won the 2019 title beating St Helens 18–4 at Wembley Stadium on 24 August 2019 were knocked out by Salford in the semi-finals.

The format of the competition remained as eight knock-out rounds followed by the final but the schedule was placed into disarray by the COVID-19 pandemic. The final was scheduled to be played on 18 July instead of the August bank holiday weekend. However on 16 March all rugby league games were suspended indefinitely, due to the COVID-19 pandemic in the United Kingdom. The suspension was followed, on 19 May 2020, with confirmation from the Rugby Football League (RFL) of the postponement of the Challenge Cup Final, which had been scheduled for 18 July at Wembley Stadium. The competition did not resume until 22 August with the final to be played on Saturday 17 October.

== Entry ==
Entry into the Cup is mandatory for the English and Welsh professional teams, but is by invitation for all other clubs, either professional or amateur. French side Toulouse declined to enter for 2020, after also declining to play in previous years. Canadian side Toronto Wolfpack rejoined the competition after declining to play in the 2019 competition and by agreement would play all their matches in away from home. Serbian club, Red Star who played in 2019 declined an invitation to enter in 2020 due to the demands the trip to England made on their players.

== Effects of the COVID-19 pandemic ==
On 16 March 2020, the RFL announced that all rugby league games had been suspended initially, until at least April, due to the COVID-19 pandemic. However, on 24 March, rugby league clubs held a board meeting via conference call, attended in part by senior officials of the Rugby Football League, for further discussion of how to respond to the current public health crisis. It was agreed that until further notice, all rugby league fixtures would be suspended indefinitely.

The competition recommenced with the rescheduling of the sixth round on 22 August, after the RFL announced that rugby league could return from 2 August but with all games to be played behind closed doors. The pandemic caused Toronto Wolfpack to withdraw from the competition on 20 July, and just over a week later, on 28 July, the remaining Championship and League 1 clubs also withdrew from the competition. These withdrawals caused the RFL to reconsider the structure of the competition as only 10 Super League clubs remained in the competition. The decision was made to redraw and restructure the sixth round to comprise just two fixtures with only four teams, with the remaining six teams automatically receiving byes to the quarter-finals.

The suspension of the competition also raised some uncertainty about the availability of Wembley as the venue for the final and it was not until 22 September that Wembley was re-confirmed as the venue for the final of the competition. It was hoped that spectators would be allowed into the final but on 28 September, the RFL confirmed that due to new COVID-19 restrictions being announced that the game will be played behind closed doors for the first time in the history of the competition.

== Round details ==
Round	Date	Revised dates	Clubs involved this round	Winners from previous round	New entries this round	Leagues entering at this round
Round 1	11–12 January	—N/a	44	—N/a	44	37 English amateur clubs; One Scottish, one Irish and two Welsh clubs; Three Armed Forces teams; British Police
Round 2	25–26 January	—N/a	22	22	—N/a	—N/a
Round 3	8–9 February	—N/a	22	11	11	League 1
Round 4	22–23 February	—N/a	24	11	13	Championship excluding Toulouse Olympique
Round 5	14–15 March	—N/a	16	12	4	Super League teams who finished outside the top eight in 2019; Huddersfield Giants, Hull Kingston Rovers, Toronto Wolfpack and Wakefield Trinity
Round 6	4–5 April	22–23 August	16 planned 4 actual	8 planned 0 actual	8 planned 4 actual	2019 Super League top 8 as originally scheduled; four Super League teams drawn at random
Quarter-finals	9–10 May	19–20 September	8	8	0 planned 6 actual	—N/a
Semi-finals	6–7 June	3 October	4	4	—N/a	—N/a
Final	18 July	17 October	2	2	—N/a	—N/a

== First round ==
The draw for the first round was made at the home of community club Bentley, near Doncaster. Ties were played over the weekend of 11–12 January 2020.

Home	Score	Away	Match Information
Home	Score	Away	Date and Time	Venue	Referee	Attendance (Note: Attendances for games involving only community clubs are not recorded)
Skirlaugh	8–6	Hunslet Club Parkside	11 January 2020, 12:30pm	Eastside Community Sports Trust		—N/a
Barrow Island	84–6	Rhondda Outlaws	11 January 2020, 1:30pm	Barrow Island Rugby Club		—N/a
Thornhill Trojans	22–16	Thatto Heath Crusaders	11 January 2020, 1:30pm	Thornhill Sports and Community Centre		—N/a
Underbank Rangers	22–10	Lock Lane	11 January 2020, 1:30pm	Lock Lane Sports Centre		—N/a
Distington	50–10	Bedford Tigers	11 January 2020, 2:00pm	Distington Community Sports Club		—N/a
Edinburgh Eagles	10–58	Ashton Bears	11 January 2020, 2:00pm	Royal High Rugby Club		—N/a
Featherstone Lions	12–24	West Bowling	11 January 2020, 2:00pm	Featherstone Lions ARLFC		—N/a
Ince Rose Bridge	50–10	East Hull	11 January 2020, 2:00pm	Ince Rosebridge Sports and Community Club		—N/a
Milford	47–12	Wigan St Judes	11 January 2020, 2:00pm	Milford Sports Club		—N/a
Pilkingtons Recs	18–28	West Hull	11 January 2020, 2:00pm	Ruskin Park Health and Leisure Centre		—N/a
Rochdale Mayfield	32–12	London Chargers	11 January 2020, 2:00pm	Mayfield Sports Centre		—N/a
Siddal	38–0	Saddleworth Rangers	11 January 2020, 2:00pm	Siddal ARLFC		—N/a
Upton	30–4	Jarrow Vikings	11 January 2020, 2:00pm	Quarry Lane		—N/a
West Bank Bears	26–24	Royal Navy	11 January 2020, 2:00pm	Ted Gleave Sports Ground		—N/a
Wigan St Patricks	30–14	Dewsbury Moor	11 January 2020, 2:00pm	Clarington Park		—N/a
York Acorn	36–14	Hammersmith Hills Hoists	11 January 2020, 2:00pm	Acorn Sports and Social Club		—N/a
British Army	26–10	Oulton Raiders	11 January 2020, 2:30pm	Army Rugby Stadium		—N/a
Leigh Miners Rangers	28–26	Stanningley	11 January 2020, 2:30pm	Leigh Miners Welfare Institute		—N/a
Normanton Knights	30–24	Longhorns	12 January 2020, 1:30pm	Normanton Amateur Rugby Club		—N/a
RAF	10–18	Bentley	12 January 2020, 1:30pm	RAF Cranwell		—N/a
Sherwood Wolf Hunt	26–24	Wests Warriors	12 January 2020, 1:30pm	Debdale Sports & Recreational Club		—N/a
GB Police	66–0	Torfaen Tigers	12 January 2020, 2:00pm	Mayfield Sports Centre		—N/a

== Second round ==
The draw for the 2nd round was made at the studios of BBC Radio Leeds and broadcast live on air. Ties were played over the weekend of 25–26 January 2020.

Home	Score	Away	Match Information
Home	Score	Away	Date and Time	Venue	Referee	Attendance
Wigan St Patricks	10–30	West Hull	25 January 2020, 12:30pm	Clarington Park		—N/a
Thornhill Trojans	58–14	Normanton Knights	25 January 2020, 1:30pm	Thornhill Sports & Community Club		—N/a
York Acorn	34–14	Barrow Island	25 January 2020, 1:30pm	Acorn Sports & Social Club		—N/a
British Army	17–16	Skirlaugh	25 January 2020, 2:00pm	Army Rugby Stadium		—N/a
GB Police	18–19	Rochdale Mayfield	25 January 2020, 2:00pm	Mayfield Sports Club		—N/a
Milford	12–19	Ince Rose Bridge	25 January 2020, 2:00pm	Milford Sports Club		—N/a
Siddal	62–4	Ashton Bears	25 January 2020, 2:00pm	Siddal ARLFC		—N/a
Underbank Rangers	28–14	Distington	25 January 2020, 2:00pm	The Cross Grounds		—N/a
West Bank Bears	18–20	Bentley	25 January 2020, 2:00pm	Ted Gleave Sports Ground		—N/a
Leigh Miners Rangers	26–6	Upton	25 January 2020, 2:30pm	Leigh Miners Welfare Institute		—N/a
Sherwood Wolf Hunt	6–38	West Bowling	26 January 2020, 1:30pm	Debdale Sports & Recreational Club		—N/a

== Third round ==
The draw for the third round was made live from Rochdale Hornets Crown Oil Arena. Ties were played on the weekend of the 8–9 February 2020. Several matches scheduled for 9 February were postponed due to the adverse weather caused by Storm Ciara and played the following weekend.

Home	Score	Away	Match Information
Home	Score	Away	Date and Time	Venue	Referee	Attendance
Rochdale Mayfield	6–64	North Wales Crusaders	8 February 2020, 12:30pm	Mayfield Sports Centre	S. Race	229
Siddal	10–6	West Hull	8 February 2020, 2:00pm	Exley Lane	J. Stearne	450
Thornhill Trojans	20–24	Doncaster RLFC	8 February 2020, 2:00pm	Tetley's Stadium	A. Sweet	Not recorded
British Army	34–22	Ince Rose Bridge	8 February 2020, 2:15pm	Aldershot Military Stadium	N. Bennett	100
Leigh Miners Rangers	20–4	Bentley	8 February 2020, 2:30pm	Twist Lane	M. Smail	376
West Wales Raiders	8–30	Underbank Rangers	9 February 2020, 2:00pm	Stebonheath Park	J. Jones	50
Hunslet RLFC	36–4	Coventry Bears	9 February 2020, 3:00pm	South Leeds Stadium	C. Worsley	225
Keighley Cougars	12–16	Newcastle Thunder	15 February 2020, 2:00pm (Note: Match postponed on original date due to poor weather conditions caused by Storm Ciara)	Cougar Park	L. Staveley	402
Workington Town	28–22	West Bowling	16 February 2020, 2:00pm	Derwent Park	K. Moore	950
Barrow Raiders	38–18	London Skolars	16 February 2020, 3:00pm	Matt Johnson Prestige Stadium	B. Milligan	769
Rochdale Hornets	54–10	York Acorn	16 February 2020, 3:00pm	AJ Bell Stadium (Note: Match moved to Salford Red Devils' ground as the Crown Oil Arena was unplayable.)	A. Sweet	200

== Fourth round ==
The draw for the fourth round was made live on BBC Sport, live from Halifax's MBI Shay Stadium. Ties were played over the weekend of 21–23 February 2020.

Home	Score	Away	Match Information
Home	Score	Away	Date and Time	Venue	Referee	Attendance
Leigh Centurions	36–10	Batley Bulldogs	21 February 2020, 8:00pm	Leigh Sports Village	M. Rossleigh	1,586
Sheffield Eagles	20–18	Halifax RFC	22 February 2020, 2:00pm	Mobile Rocket Stadium	J. Vella	429
Siddal A.R.L.F.C.	10–30	Newcastle Thunder	22 February 2020, 2:00pm	Siddal ARLFC	N. Horton	450
Featherstone Rovers	18–16	Barrow Raiders	22 February 2020, 3:00pm	LD Nutrition Stadium	A. Moore	1,120
Swinton Lions	56–0	Leigh Miners Rangers	22 February 2020, 3:00pm	Heywood Road	K. Moore	622
Bradford Bulls	22–0	Underbank Rangers	23 February 2020, 1:00pm	Tetley's Stadium	C. Worsley	1,458
North Wales Crusaders	18–22	Hunslet RLFC	23 February 2020, 2:30pm	Queensway Stadium	B. Pearson	249
London Broncos	22–24	York City Knights	23 February 2020, 3:00pm	Trailfinders Sports Ground	T. Grant	543
Rochdale Hornets	54–10	British Army	23 February 2020, 3:00pm	Crown Oil Arena	J. McMullen	400
Whitehaven RLFC	16–22	Dewsbury Rams	11 March 2020, 7:00pm (Note: Match postponed on 23 February due to a waterlogged pitch.)	Recreation Ground	J Smith	427
Widnes Vikings	52–12	Oldham Roughyeds	23 February 2020, 3:00pm	DCBL Stadium	G. Hewer	1,564
Workington Town	22–12	Doncaster RLFC	23 February 2020, 3:00pm	Derwent Park	T. Crashley	612

== Fifth round ==
The draw for Round Five was streamed live on BBC Sport and Our League on Monday 24 February at 6.30pm live from Hull Kingston Rovers’ Hull College Craven Park. Rovers were one of four Super League clubs joining the competition at this stage, alongside Huddersfield Giants, Toronto Wolfpack and Wakefield Trinity. Ties were played over the weekend of 14–15 March 2020.

Home	Score	Away	Match Information
Home	Score	Away	Date and Time	Venue	Referee	Attendance
Toronto Wolfpack	18–0	Huddersfield Giants	11 March 2020, 7:45pm	John Smith's Stadium (Note: Toronto were drawn as the home team but under their agreement with the RFL Toronto do not play cup games at home)	S Mikalauskas	1,488
Featherstone Rovers	46–6	Hunslet	13 March 2020, 7:30pm	LD Nutrition Stadium	A Moore	1,002
Wakefield Trinity	17–14	Bradford Bulls	13 March 2020, 7:45pm	Mobile Rocket Stadium	M Griffiths	3,112
Sheffield Eagles	34–18	Workington Town	15 March 2020, 2:00pm	Keepmoat Stadium	J Vella	323
Hull Kingston Rovers	22–19	Leigh Centurions	15 March 2020, 3:00pm	Hull College Craven Park	G Hewer	2,620
Newcastle Thunder	38–30	Dewsbury Rams	15 March 2020, 3:00pm	Kingston Park	B Pearson	689
Widnes Vikings	32–16	Swinton Lions	15 March 2020, 3:00pm	DCBL Stadium	T Grant	1,527
York City Knights	70–12	Rochdale Hornets	15 March 2020, 3:00pm	LD Nutrition Stadium (Note: Bootham Crescent unavailable to York City Knights.)	J Smith	400

== Sixth round ==
The draw for the sixth round was made live from MediaCityUK in Salford on Monday 16 March 2020, and was streamed live on BBC Sport, and the Our League app from 6:00pm. Originally scheduled to be made in New York, the draw was moved due to the COVID-19 pandemic.

Defending champions Warrington were due to start the defence of their title at this stage, along with other Super League teams Castleford, Catalans, Hull FC, Leeds, Salford, St Helens and Wigan. Ties were scheduled to be played over the weekend of 4–5 April 2020, however due to the suspension of all rugby league games as part of the United Kingdom's response to the coronavirus pandemic meant that these dates were speculative and therefore rescheduled for a later date. The fixtures drawn on 16 March were:

- Leeds Rhinos v Hull Kingston Rovers
- Newcastle Thunder v Toronto Wolfpack
- Salford Red Devils v St Helens
- Sheffield Eagles v Hull F.C.
- Wakefield Trinity v Featherstone Rovers
- Widnes Vikings v Catalans Dragons
- Wigan Warriors v Warrington Wolves
- York City Knights v Castleford Tigers

On 17 July 2020, the RFL announced that the competition would resume on 22 August with a double header at the John Smith's Stadium, Huddersfield involving the Warrington v Wigan and Salford v St Helens with both games shown live on BBC TV. A few days later on 21 July Toronto Wolfpack announced that the club would be taking no further part in the Challenge Cup due to financial problems associated with the COVID-19 pandemic.

The RFL had also decided to abandon the Championship and League 1 competitions and following Toronto's withdrawal a meeting was held on 27 July to consider the future of the cup competition. The following day, the five non-Super League teams left in the cup; Featherstone Rovers, Newcastle Thunder, Sheffield Eagles, York City Knights, and Widnes Vikings, all announced that they were withdrawing from the competition. In response to this, the RFL announced that the whole of the sixth round was to be redrawn, involving just the 10 Super League sides remaining in the competition. Four teams would play in the revised sixth round, with the six remaining teams not to receive a tie for this round automatically gaining a bye to the quarter-finals.

The redraw for the sixth round and the draw for the quarter-finals was made on 29 July. The two sixth round ties were due to be played as a double header at the John Smith's Stadium, Huddersfield as previously announced, with both ties being televised live on the BBC. During the week of 10 August, a number of Hull players and coaching staff tested positive for COVID-19, so the club's next fixtures, including the sixth round tie against Castleford were postponed. The Castleford v Hull fixture was eventually played on 13 September.

Home	Score	Away	Match Information
Home	Score	Away	Date and Time	Venue	Referee
Catalans Dragons	36–24	Wakefield Trinity	22 August 2020, 2:30pm	John Smith's Stadium	C Kendall
Castleford Tigers	16–29	Hull FC	13 September 2020, 3:00pm (Note: Match originally scheduled for 22 August, but postponed due to positive COVID-19 tests among the Hull squad.)	Totally Wicked Stadium	L Moore

== Quarter-finals ==
Home	Score	Away	Match Information
Home	Score	Away	Date and Time	Venue	Referee
Catalans Dragons	18–22 (Note: After golden-point extra time. Scores tied at 18-all after 80 minutes)	Salford Red Devils	18 September 2020, 6:00pm	Totally Wicked Stadium	B Thaler
Leeds Rhinos	48–18	Hull KR	18 September 2020, 8:15pm	Totally Wicked Stadium	L Moore
Warrington Wolves	20–18	St Helens	19 September 2020, 2:30pm	AJ Bell Stadium	C Kendall
Hull FC	4–36	Wigan Warriors	19 September 2020, 5:00pm	AJ Bell Stadium	R Hicks

== Semi-finals ==
The draw for the semi-finals was made on 19 September with both games played at the Totally Wicked Stadium, St Helens as a double-header on 3 October. The draw was made live on BBC Two at the A J Bell stadium during the half-time interval of the last quarter-final match between Hull FC and Wigan.

Team A	Score	Team B	Match Information
Team A	Score	Team B	Date and Time	Venue	Referee
Leeds Rhinos	26–12	Wigan Warriors	3 October 2020, 2:30pm	Totally Wicked Stadium	C Kendall
Salford Red Devils	24–22	Warrington Wolves	3 October 2020, 5:00pm	Totally Wicked Stadium	L Moore

== Final ==
Home	Score	Away	Match Information
Home	Score	Away	Date and Time	Venue	Referee
Leeds Rhinos	17–16	Salford Red Devils	17 October 2020, 3:00pm	Wembley Stadium	L Moore

== Broadcast matches ==
Round	Match	Date	Broadcast method
1st	Skirlaugh v Hunslet Club Parkside	11 January 2020, 12:30pm	Streamed live BBC iPlayer and BBC Red Button
1st	RAF v Bentley	12 January 2020, 1:30pm	Streamed live on Our League
2nd	Wigan St. Patricks v West Hull	25 January 2020, 12:30pm	Streamed live BBC iplayer and BBC Red Button
2nd	Sherwood Wolf Hunt v West Bowling	26 January 2020, 1:30pm	Streamed live on Our League
3rd	Rochdale Mayfield v North Wales Crusaders	8 February 2020, 12:30pm	Streamed live BBC iPlayer and BBC Red Button
3rd	British Army v Ince Rose Bridge	8 February 2020, 2:15pm	streamed live on Our League
3rd	Keighley Cougars v Newcastle Thunder	15 February 2020, 3:00pm	Streamed live on Our League
4th	Bradford Bulls v Underbank Rangers	23 February 2020, 1:00pm	Streamed live on BBC iPlayer
4th	London Broncos v York City Knights	23 February 2020, 3:00pm	Streamed live on Our League
5th	Toronto Wolfpack v Huddersfield Giants	11 March 2020, 7:45pm	Streamed live on Our League
6th	Catalans Dragons v Wakefield Trinity	22 August 2020, 2:30pm	Live on BBC One
6th	Castleford Tigers v Hull FC	13 September 2020, 3:00pm	Live on BBC One
QF	Warrington Wolves v St Helens	19 September 2020, 2:30pm	Live on BBC One
QF	Hull FC v Wigan Warriors	19 September 2020, 5:00pm	Live on BBC Two
SF	Leeds Rhinos v Wigan Warriors	3 October 2020, 2:00pm	Live on BBC One
SF	Salford Red Devils v Warrington Wolves	3 October 2020, 5:00pm	Live on BBC Two
F	Leeds Rhinos v Salford Red Devils	17 October 2020, 3:00pm	Live on BBC One
