= 2023 Challenge Cup =

British rugby league knockout tournament

- Duration: 9 rounds
- Number of teams: 71
- Highest attendance: 58,213 (Final ) – Hull KR v Leigh Leopards (12 August 2023)
- Lowest attendance: 255; North Wales Crusaders v Royal Navy (25 February 2023)
- Aggregate attendance: 146,201
- Broadcast partners: BBC Sport; Our League; The Sportsman; Viaplay Sports
- Winners: Leigh Leopards
- Runners-up: Hull KR
- Lance Todd Trophy: Lachlan Lam

The 2023 Challenge Cup, known for sponsorship reasons as the 2023 Betfred Challenge Cup, was the 122nd edition of the Challenge Cup, the main rugby league knockout cup tournament in British rugby league run by the Rugby Football League (RFL). It began over the weekend of 11–12 February 2023 and ended with the final, at Wembley Stadium on Saturday 12 August.

The defending champions were Wigan Warriors, who won the 2022 Challenge Cup Final, by narrowly defeating Huddersfield Giants 16–14, but they were eliminated in the semi finals, as Brad Schneider kicked a drop goal in extra time, to win the game for Hull KR 11–10.

== Background ==
The competition started on 11 February and concluded with the final on 12 August. The final returned to its traditional home, Wembley Stadium in London, after being played at the Tottenham Hotspur Stadium in 2022. League One team Cornwall R.L.F.C. made their first appearance in the competition having declined to enter in their debut season.

All professional RFL member clubs were invited to participate as well as a number of invited amateur teams including teams representing the British armed forces. This year the entry of the amateur clubs was split; in round 1, the armed forces teams entered along with the Scottish, Irish and Welsh champions with English teams from outside the National Conference League Premier Division making up the 36 teams to compete in the round. Ten teams from the National Conference League Premier Division joined in round 2, together with the 10 teams from League One. Shortly after the format for the tournament was announced, West Wales Raiders withdrew from the competition. The RFL announced that rounds one and two would be altered slightly to cope with this by increasing the number of teams in round one to 36 and reducing the numbers of new clubs in round two from 21 to 20.

The Championship clubs with the exception of Toulouse Olympique who declined to enter, joined the tournament in round 3. Rounds 4 and 5 reduced the lower league clubs to four before the Super League clubs entered in round 6.

=== Format and dates ===
Challenge Cup competition format
Round	Date	Clubs involved this round	Winners from previous round	New entries this round	Leagues entering at this round
Round 1	11–12 February	36	None	36	36 UK based community league teams
Round 2	25–26 February	38	18	20	10 teams from National Conference League Premier Division and 10 League One
Round 3	9–12 March	32	19	13	All teams from the Championship except Toulouse Olympique
Round 4	30 March – 2 April	16	16	None	
Round 5	20–23 April	8	8	None	
Round 6	18–21 May	16	4	12	All 12 teams from the Super League
Quarter-finals	15–18 June	8	8	None	
Semi-finals	22 July	4	4	None	
Final	12 August	2	2	None	

== First round ==
The draw for the first and second rounds were made at Wembley Stadium on 12 January 2023. Ties were played over the weekend of 11 and 12 February 2023.

Challenge Cup round 1 fixtures
Home	Score	Away	Match Information
Home	Score	Away	Date and Time	Venue	Referee	Attendance
West Bowling	30–12	Waterhead	11 February; 11:00	Horsfall Stadium	O. Salmon	Not given (Note: Attendances not recorded for matches involving amateur clubs)
Edinburgh Eagles	20–30	Saddleworth Rangers	11 February, 13:15	Royal High School, Edinburgh	S. Fraser	Not given
Brentwood Eels	34–24	Bedford Tigers	11 February, 13:30	Ashwells Road, Brentwood	M. Rossleigh	Not given
Royal Navy	28–16	Barrow Island	11 February, 13:30	The Victory Stadium, Portsmouth	J. Jones	Not given
Skirlaugh	16–26	Wests Warriors	11 February, 13:30	Slaithes Lane, Hedon	J. Ruckledge	Not given
Westgate Common	36–18	Crosfields	11 February, 13:30	Park Grove Road, Wakefield	D. Arnold	Not given
British Army	12–28	Ashton Bears	11 February; 14:00	Aldershot Military Stadium	W. Gilder	Not given
Distington	4–16	Orrell St James	11 February; 14:00	West View Road, Distington	J. Hughes	Not given
Doncaster Toll Bar	24–36	Royal Air Force	11 February; 14:00	Prospect Road, Doncaster	M. McKelvey	Not given
Featherstone Lions	6–20	Great Britain Police	11 February; 14:00	Wakefield Road, Featherstone	S. Jenkinson	Not given
Fryston Warriors	38–22	Thornhill Trojans	11 February; 14:00	Askham Road, Ferry Fryston	C. Hughes	Not given
Hull Dockers	54–10	Rhondda Outlaws	11 February; 14:00	The Willows, Hull	D. Frederick	Not given
Stanningley	38–4	Milford	11 February; 14:00	The Arthur Miller Stadium, Leeds	A. Williams	Not given
London Chargers	32–12	North Herts Crusaders	11 February; 14:30	Kings House School, Chiswick	M. Cowan	Not given
Wigan St Pats	22–30	Ince Rose Bridge	11 February; 14:30	Harper St, Wigan	F. Lincoln	Not given
Hammersmith Hills Hoists	8–42	Dublin City Exiles	11 February; 17:00	Chiswick Rugby Club, Chiswick	H. Winnard	Not given
Heworth	22–6	Oulton Raiders	12 February, 12:00	Elmpark Way, Heworth	J. Covell-Wood	Not given
Jarrow Vikings	26–40	Myton Warriors	12 February, 13:30	Monkton Stadium, Jarrow	T. Gibbs	Not given

== Second round ==
Challenge Cup round 2 fixtures
Home	Score	Away	Match Information
Home	Score	Away	Date and Time	Venue	Referee	Attendance
Cornwall	14–20	Rochdale Mayfield	25 February; 13:00	The Memorial Ground, Penryn	M. Rossleigh	1,061
Brentwood Eels	4–58	Wath Brow Hornets	25 February; 13:30	Ashwells Road, Brentwood	W. Gilder	Not given
Lock Lane	22–30	West Bowling	25 February; 13:30	Lock Lane, Castleford	A. Rhodes	Not given
Fryston Warriors	12–28	Stanningley	25 February; 13:30	Askham Road, Ferry Fryston	A. Belafonte	Not given
Saddleworth Rangers	4–18	Thatto Heath Crusaders	25 February; 13:30	Shaw Hall Bank Road	J. Hughes	Not given
Ashton Bears	8–38	Dewsbury Rams	25 February; 14:00	Crown Flatt (Note: Although drawn at home Ashton Bears agreed to the match being played at Dewsbury.)	E. Burrow	Not given
Myton Warriors	22–34	Leigh Miners Rangers	25 February; 14:00	Marist Sporting Club, Hull	M. Clayton	Not given
North Wales Crusaders	70–0	Royal Navy	25 February; 14:00	Eirias Stadium	J. Lincoln	255
RAF	10–12	York Acorn	25 February; 14:00	RAF Cranwell	S. Jenkinson	Not given
Wests Warriors	18–14	London Chargers	25 February; 14:00	Twyford Avenue, London	H. Winnard	Not given
Hunslet ARLFC	66–0	Pilkington Recs	25 February; 14:30	The Oval, Leeds	C. Hughes	Not given
Siddal	14–8	West Hull	25 February; 14:30	Exley Lane, Halifax	R. Cox	Not given
Orrell St James	68–14	Dublin City Exiles	25 February; 15:00	Bankes Avenue, Orrell	S. Houghton	Not given
Rochdale Hornets	42–4	London Skolars	26 February; 13:00	Spotland Stadium	M. Lynn	300
GB Police	18–22	Westgate Common	26 February; 13:00	Scholes Lane, St. Helens	T. Jones	Not given
Workington Town	68–6	Ince Rose Bridge	26 February; 14:00	Derwent Park	B. Milligan	603
Hull Dockers	4–50	Midlands Hurricanes	26 February; 14:45	Craven Park, Hull	A. Sweet	Not given
Doncaster	28–26	Oldham	26 February; 15:00	Keepmoat Stadium	K. Moore	517
Hunslet	68–6	Heworth	26 February; 15:00	South Leeds Stadium	L. Bland	556

== Third round ==
The third round draw was made on 27 February.

Challenge Cup round 3 fixtures
Home	Score	Away	Match Information
Home	Score	Away	Date and Time	Venue	Referee	Attendance
Westgate Common	12–15	Hunslet A.R.L.F.C	11 March, 13:30	Park Grove Road	E. Burrow	Not given
Leigh Miners Rangers	10–38	Rochdale Mayfield	11 March, 14:00	Twist Lane	M. Smaill	Not given
Orrell St James	12–19	Midlands Hurricanes	11 March, 14:00	Bankes Avenue, Orrell	M. Lynn	Not given
London Broncos	32–10	Whitehaven	11 March, 15:00	Plough Lane	L. Rush	Not given
Wests Warriors	4–80	Widnes Vikings	11 March, 15:00	DCBL Stadium (Note: Wests Warriors ceded home advantage and agreed to play at Widnes.)	R. Cox	Not given
Thatto Heath Crusaders	10–18	North Wales Crusaders	12 March, 12:30	Close Street	S. Mikalauskas	Not given
Stanningley	16–58	Newcastle Thunder	12 March, 13:00 (Note: Originally scheduled for 11 March but postponed due to a frozen pitch.)	The Arthur Miller Stadium	L. Bland	Not given
Batley Bulldogs	60–0	Wath Brow Hornets	12 March, 14:00	Mount Pleasant	B. Milligan	Not given
Dewsbury Rams	38–18	Rochdale Hornets	12 March, 14:00	Crown Flatt	C. Worsley	445
Siddal	12–34	Sheffield Eagles	12 March, 14:30 (Note: Originally scheduled for 11 March but postponed on 10 March due to adverse weather conditions.)	Exley Lane, Halifax	K. Moore	not given
Barrow Raiders	32–14	Swinton Lions	12 March, 15:00	Craven Park	J. Vella	1,161
Bradford Bulls	62–6	York Acorn	12 March, 15:00	Odsal Stadium	A. Belafonte	1,143
Doncaster	24–20	Workington Town	12 March, 15:00	Eco-Power Stadium	N. Bennett	485
Featherstone Rovers	18–22	Halifax Panthers	12 March, 15:00	Post Office Road	L. Moore	1,487
Hunslet	14–16	Keighley Cougars	12 March, 15:00	South Leeds Stadium	M. Rossleigh	519
York Knights	52–12	West Bowling	12 March, 15:00	York Community Stadium	A. Sweet	1,040

== Fourth round ==
The draw for the fourth and fifth rounds was made on Wednesday 15 March at Millom RLFC, the oldest amateur club. No new teams enter in these rounds so the fourth round comprises just eight matches.

Challenge Cup round 4 fixtures
Home	Score	Away	Match Information
Home	Score	Away	Date and Time	Venue	Referee	Attendance
Rochdale Mayfield	12–22	Newcastle Thunder	1 April, 13:00	Mayfield Sports Centre	N. Bennett	Not given
Keighley Cougars	36–14	North Wales Crusaders	1 April, 15:00	Cougar Park	M. Smaill	862
London Broncos	66–16	Doncaster	1 April, 15:00	Priory Lane	S. Mikalauskas	428
York Knights	24–22	Sheffield Eagles	2 April, 12:30	York Community Stadium	J. Vella	832
Hunslet ARLFC	6–80	Batley Bulldogs	2 April, 14:00	Mount Pleasant (Note: Fixture moved to Batley after Hunslet's ground deemed unsuitable for a game against a professional team.)	B. Milligan	579
Dewsbury Rams	32–12	Widnes Vikings	2 April, 15:00	Crown Flatt	L. Rush	802
Halifax Panthers	24–18	Barrow Raiders	2 April 15:00	The Shay	T. Grant	1,474
Midlands Hurricanes	18–66	Bradford Bulls	2 April, 15:00	Odsal Stadium (Note: Midlands requested that the match be played at Bradford's Odsal Stadium.)	C. Worsley	1,003

== Fifth round ==
Drawn immediately after the fourth round draw, the four fixtures determined which teams from below Super League would progress to the draw with the 12 Super League teams.

Challenge Cup round 5 fixtures
Home	Score	Away	Match Information
Home	Score	Away	Date and Time	Venue	Referee	Attendance
York Knights	22–18	Newcastle Thunder	21 April, 19:30	York Community Stadium	N. Bennett	1,100
Halifax Panthers	26–0	Bradford Bulls	22 April, 19:00	The Shay	T. Grant	2,146
Batley Bulldogs	34–16	Keighley Cougars	23 April, 15:00	Mount Pleasant	J. Vella	923
London Broncos	36–16	Dewsbury Rams	23 April, 15:05	Priory Lane	L. Rush	353

== Sixth round ==
The draw for the sixth round took place live on BBC News' Sportsday on 24 April. The draw was made by England women's captain Jodie Cunningham.

Ties were played over the weekend of 19-21 May.

Challenge Cup round 6 fixtures
Home	Score	Away	Match Information
Home	Score	Away	Date and Time	Venue	Referee	Attendance
Halifax Panthers	6–26	St Helens	19 May, 19:45	The Shay	A. Moore	4,693
Wakefield Trinity	12–40	Leigh Leopards	19 May, 19:45	The Be Well Support Stadium	B. Thaler	1,568
Hull KR	50–0	Batley Bulldogs	19 May, 20:00	Sewell Group Craven Park	T. Grant	5,200
Leeds Rhinos	14–18	Wigan Warriors	20 May, 14:30	Headingley	C. Kendall	7,103
Catalans Dragons	14–16	Warrington Wolves	20 May, 17:00	Stade Gilbert Brutus	J. Smith	5,014
Salford Red Devils	42–40	Huddersfield Giants	20 May, 19:30	AJ Bell Stadium	M. Griffiths	2,872
Castleford Tigers	8–32	Hull FC	21 May, 15:00	Mend-A-Hose Jungle	L. Moore	4,249
York Knights	36–12	London Broncos	21 May, 15:00	York Community Stadium	J. Vella	951

== Quarter-finals ==
The draw for the quarter-finals was made live on BBC Two after the conclusion of the sixth-round tie between Castleford and Hull FC. The draw was made by John Kear. Ties were played over the weekend of 17–18 June.

Challenge Cup quarter-final fixtures
Home	Score	Away	Match Information
Home	Score	Away	Date and Time	Venue	Referee	Attendance
Hull KR	28–10	Salford Red Devils	17 June, 12:00	Craven Park	B. Thaler	6,289
Hull FC	18–32	St Helens	17 June, 14:30	MKM Stadium	C. Kendall	8,127
Wigan Warriors	14–12	Warrington Wolves	18 June, 14:30	DW Stadium	L. Moore	9,302
York Knights	14–34	Leigh Leopards	18 June, 17:00	York Community Stadium	J. Smith	2,412

== Semi-finals ==
The draw for the semi-finals was conducted on 18 June, during half time in the Wigan v Warrington match. The draw was made by Lois Forsell, head coach of Leeds Rhinos.

Ties took place over the weekend of 22–23 July, each being a double header with one of the semi-finals of the women's competition.

Challenge Cup semi-final fixtures
Team 1	Score	Team 2	Match Information
Team 1	Score	Team 2	Date and Time	Venue	Referee	Attendance
Leigh Leopards	12–10	St Helens	22 July, 14:30	Halliwell Jones Stadium	C. Kendall	12,113
Hull KR	11–10 (Note: after extra time)	Wigan Warriors	23 July, 17:00	Headingley	L. Moore	10,926

== Final ==
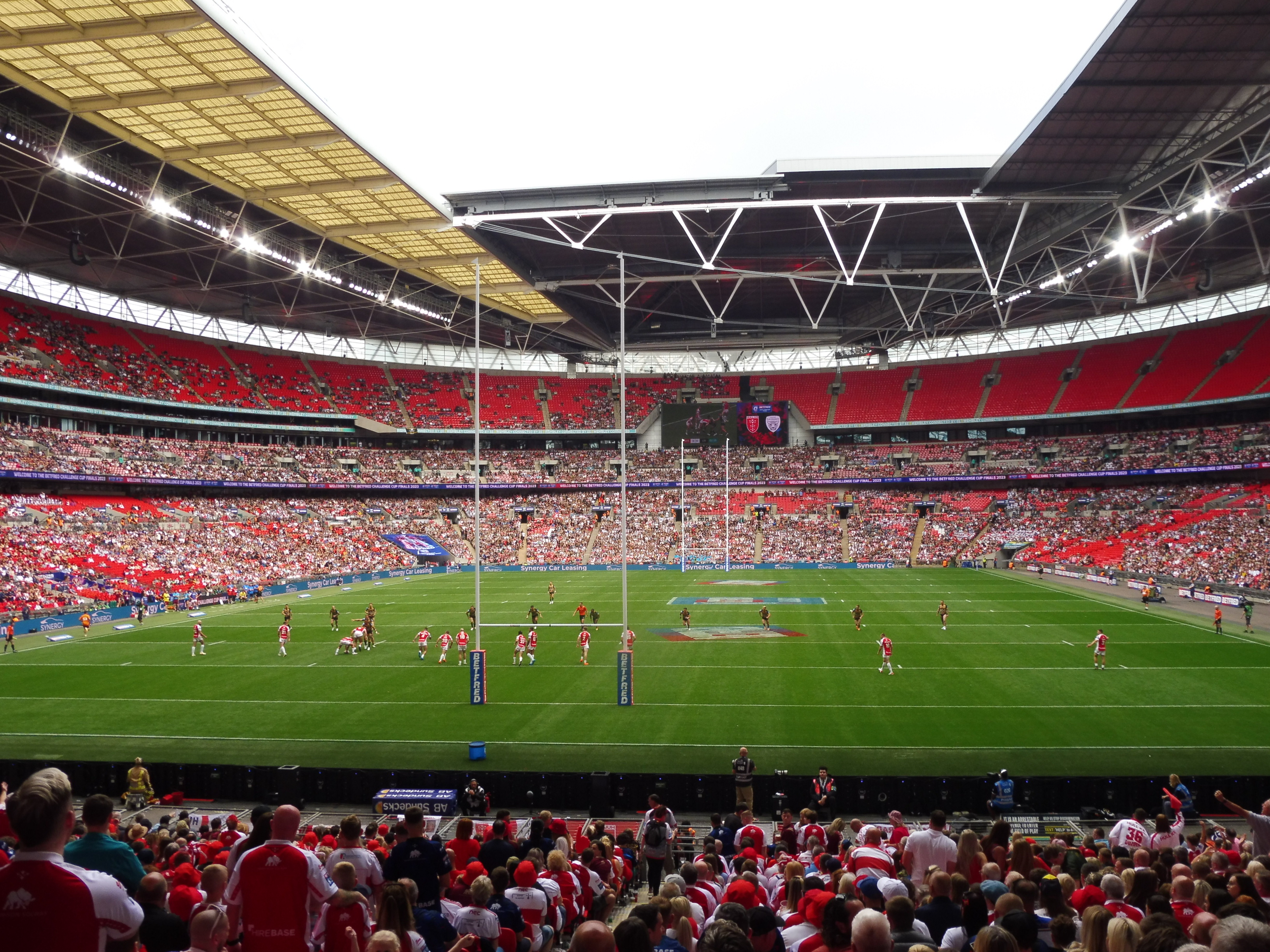
Hull KR vs Leigh Leopards in the 2023 Challenge Cup final

On 12 August 2022, the RFL announced that the Challenge Cup Final would return to Wembley after its one year hiatus, and be played as a triple header, alongside the women's final, and the 1895 Cup final. The final was played on 12 August 2023.

Challenge Cup Final
Team 1	Score	Team 2	Match Information
Team 1	Score	Team 2	Date and Time	Venue	Referee	Attendance
Hull KR	16–17 (Note: after golden point extra time)	Leigh Leopards	12 August, 15:00	Wembley Stadium	C. Kendall	58,213

== Broadcast matches ==
Broadcast matches
Round	Match	Date	Broadcast method
1st	Edinburgh Eagles v Saddleworth Rangers	11 February	Broadcast live on BBC Red Button
1st	Wigan St Pats v Ince Rose Bridge	11 February	Streamed live on The Sportsman
2nd	Cornwall v Rochdale Mayfield	25 February	Broadcast live on BBC Red Button
2nd	Hull Dockers v Midlands Hurricanes	26 February	Streamed live on The Sportsman
3rd	Thatto Heath Crusaders v North Wales Crusaders	12 March	Broadcast live on BBC Red Button
3rd	Featherstone Rovers v Halifax Panthers	12 March	Streamed live on The Sportsman
4th	York Knights v Sheffield Eagles	2 April	Broadcast live on BBC Red Button
4th	Dewsbury Rams v Widnes Vikings	2 April	Streamed live on The Sportsman
5th	Halifax Panthers v Bradford Bulls	22 April	Broadcast live on BBC Red Button
5th	Batley Bulldogs v Keighley Cougars	23 April	Streamed live on The Sportsman
6th	Halifax Panthers v St Helens	19 May	Broadcast live on Viaplay
6th	Leeds Rhinos v Wigan Warriors	20 May	Broadcast live on BBC One
6th	Salford Red Devils v Huddersfield Giants	20 May	Broadcast live on Viaplay
6th	Castleford Tigers v Hull F.C.	21 May	Broadcast live on BBC Two
QF	Hull KR v Salford Red Devils	17 June	Broadcast live on Viaplay
QF	Hull FC v St Helens	17 June	Broadcast live on BBC One
QF	Wigan Warriors v Warrington Wolves	18 June	Broadcast live on BBC One
QF	York Knights v Leigh Leopards	18 June	Broadcast live on Viaplay
SF	Leigh Leopards v St Helens	22 July	Broadcast live on BBC One
SF	Hull KR v Wigan Warriors	23 July	Broadcast live on BBC Two
F	Hull KR v Leigh Leopards	12 August	Broadcast live on BBC One

== See also ==
- 2023 Women's Challenge Cup
