= 2016 Challenge Cup =

Rugby league tournament

2016 Ladbrokes Challenge Cup
- Duration: 9 Rounds
- Number of teams: 75
- Highest attendance: 76,235 (Final)
- Lowest attendance: 55 Oxford vs Lock Lane (3rd Round) (Note: Attendances for 1st and 2nd rounds are not recorded, the 3rd round attendances are the first that are verified)
- Broadcast partners: BBC Sport; Sky Sports
- Winners: Hull
- Runners-up: Warrington Wolves
- Biggest home win: Halifax 80 – 4 Lock Lane (5th round)
- Biggest away win: Pilkington Recs 0–78 Halifax (4th round)
- Lance Todd Trophy: Marc Sneyd

The 2016 Challenge Cup, (also known as the Ladbrokes Challenge Cup for sponsorship reasons) was the 115th staging of the Challenge Cup the main rugby league knockout tournament for teams in the Super League, the British National Leagues and a number of invited amateur clubs.

The cup was won by Hull F.C. who beat Warrington Wolves 12–10 in the final at Wembley Stadium on 27 August 2016.

The defending champions, Leeds Rhinos who were looking to win the trophy three times in a row were defeated by Huddersfield Giants in the sixth round.

The format of the competition is eight knock-out rounds followed by a final. The first two rounds are composed entirely of amateur teams. The nine winners of the second round ties are joined in round 3 by the 15 Championship 1 teams. For the fourth round the 12 Championship teams are included in the draw. Starting in 2015 and continuing for the 2016 competition round 5 sees four Super League teams entering the competition. These are the four teams that finished in the bottom four positions of the 2015 Super League and are; Widnes Vikings, Hull Kingston Rovers, Salford Red Devils, and Wakefield Trinity Wildcats. These are the same four teams that joined at this stage in the 2015 competition. The remaining eight Super League teams join in round 6.

== First round ==
The draw for the first round of the 2016 Challenge Cup was held on 7 January 2016 at Wembley Stadium and featured 36 amateur teams from around the United Kingdom including two student teams, all three armed services and the police. Home teams were drawn by Tom Briscoe and the away teams drawn by Lizzie Jones.

Fixtures for the first round were played over the weekend of the 30–31 January 2016.

Home	Score	Away	Match Information
Home	Score	Away	Date and Time	Venue	Referee	Attendance
Thatto Heath Crusaders	16 – 23	Hunslet Club Parkside	30 January 2016, 13:30	Hattons Solicitors Crusader Park	M Griffiths
York Acorn	36 – 10	Sharlston Rovers	31 January 2016, 13:30	Acorn Sports & Social Club	H Neville
London Chargers	14 – 22	Shaw Cross Sharks	30 January 2016, 14:00	Old Blues RFC	G Dolan
Aberdeen Warriors	16 – 42	Northumbria University	30 January 2016, 14:00	Rubislaw Playing Fields	P Marklove
Normanton Knights	18 – 31	Distington	30 January 2016, 14:00	Queen Elizabeth Drive	A Haigh
West Bowling	0 – 16	Lock Lane	30 January 2016, 14:00	Odsal Recreation Ground	M Rossleigh
Royal Navy	18 – 20	Featherstone Lions	30 January 2016, 14:00	United Services Recreation Ground	G Evans
Hull Dockers	8 – 6	Thornhill Trojans	30 January 2016, 14:00	The Willows Sports & Social Club	C Campbell
Kells	30 – 0	Nottingham Outlaws	30 January 2016, 14:00	Old Arrowthwaite	J Stearne
East Leeds	0 – 32	Oulton Raiders	30 January 2016, 14:00	Richmond Hill	S Ellis
Millom	32 – 14	University of Hull	30 January 2016, 13:30	Coronation Field	C Braithwaite
Widnes West Bank	20 – 38	Rochdale Mayfield	30 January 2016, 14:00	Ted Gleave Sports Ground	N Bennett
Leigh Miners Rangers	14 – 20	Underbank Rangers	30 January 2016, 13:30	Twist Lane	J Jones
Wath Brow Hornets	26 – 4	Royal Air Force	30 January 2016, 14:30	Cleator Club	B Pearson
Stanningley	16 – 28	Pilkington Recs	30 January 2016, 14:30	Arthur Miller Stadium	L Staveley
Egremont Rangers	64 – 0	Blue Bulls	30 January 2016, 15:30	Gillfoot Park	J McMullen
West Hull	36 – 4	Great Britain Police	31 January 2016, 14:00	West Hull Community Park	K Moore
British Army	4 – 30	Siddal	31 January 2016, 14:30	Aldershot Military Stadium	L Moore

== Second round ==
The draw for the second round was held at RAF Coningsby on 2 February 2016 and the teams were drawn by Sheffield Eagles coach Mark Aston and Batley Bulldogs coach John Kear.

Ties were played on 13 February.

Home	Score	Away	Match Information
Home	Score	Away	Date and Time	Venue	Referee	Attendance
Millom	12 – 46	Pilkington Recs	13 February 2016, 14:00	Coronation Field	N Bennett
Shaw Cross Sharks	6 – 40	Lock Lane	13 February 2016, 14:00	Shaw Cross Club	B Pearson
Hunslet Club Parkside	18 – 19	West Hull	13 February 2016, 14:00	Hillidge Road	S Race
York Acorn	28 – 10	Distington	13 February 2016, 14:00	Acorn Sports & Social Club	P Marklove
Hull Dockers	12 – 14	Featherstone Lions	13 February 2016, 14:00	The Willows Sports & Social Club	M Griffiths
Egremont Rangers	22 – 26	Rochdale Mayfield	13 February 2016, 14:00	Gillfoot Park	M Mannifield
Siddal	18 – 16	Northumbria University	13 February 2016, 14:00	Siddal Sport & Community Centre	M Rossleigh
Kells	42 – 6	Underbank Rangers	13 February 2016, 14:30	Old Arrowthwaite	G Dolan
Wath Brow Hornets	30 – 4	Oulton Raiders	13 February 2016, 14:30	Cleator Club	J Jones

== Third round ==
The third round draw was held on 16 February at North Wales Crusaders ground, the Glyndwr University Racecourse Stadium, Wrexham. The draw was made by Paul Rowley and Lee Briers. The 12 ties were played over the last weekend of February.

Home	Score	Away	Match Information
Home	Score	Away	Date and Time	Venue	Referee	Attendance
Siddal RLFC	30 – 4	Newcastle Thunder	27 February 2016, 14:00	Reactiv Park	B Pearson	405
Rochdale Mayfield	14 - 40	Rochdale Hornets	27 February 2016, 14:00	Mayfield Sports Centre	G Hewer	937
Pilkington Recs	13 – 0	London Skolars	27 February 2016, 14:30	Ruskin Drive	L Moore	642
Kells ARLFC	12 – 6	Hemel Stags	27 February 2016, 14:30	Copeland Athletics Club	J Callaghan	250 (estimated)
Featherstone Lions	37 – 20	South Wales Scorpions	27 February 2016, 15:00	Mill Pond Stadium	S Mikalauskas	400 (estimated)
Wath Brow Hornets	14 – 32	Toulouse Olympique	27 February 2016, 15:00	Cleator Moor	D Merrick	400 (estimated)
West Hull	0 – 54	Doncaster	28 February 2016, 14:00	West Hull Community Park	T Crashley	268
North Wales Crusaders	36 – 40	Gloucestershire All Golds	28 February 2016, 14:30	Glyndŵr University Racecourse Stadium	J Bloem	324
Oxford	22 – 37	Lock Lane	28 February 2016, 14:30	Maidenhead RFC	B Robinson	55
York City Knights	66 – 0	York Acorn	28 February 2016, 15:00	Bootham Crescent	A Sweet	2,293
Hunslet Hawks	46 – 12	Barrow Raiders	28 February 2016, 15:00	South Leeds Stadium	T Grant	354
Keighley Cougars	54 – 28	Coventry Bears	28 February 2016, 15:00	Cougar Park	J Roberts	421

== Fourth round ==
The draw for the fourth round was made on 1 March at the White Lion pub in Swinton. The draw was made by retired players Adrian Morley and Paul Wellens. The 24 teams in the draw comprise the 7 Championship 1 teams and 5 National Conference League teams who won through from the third round and the 12 teams of the Championship.

Ties were played over the weekend of 18–20 March.

Home	Score	Away	Match Information
Home	Score	Away	Date and Time	Venue	Referee	Attendance
Hunslet Hawks	48 – 6	Doncaster	18 March 2016, 19:30	South Leeds Stadium	A Sweet	337
Dewsbury Rams	31 – 30	Bradford Bulls	18 March 2016, 20:00	Tetley's Stadium	C Campbell	2,021
Featherstone Lions	16 – 30	Lock Lane	19 March 2016, 14:00	The Big Fellas Stadium	C Straw	1,738
Pilkington Recs	0 – 78	Halifax	19 March 2016, 14:30	Langtree Park	T Crashley	837
Batley Bulldogs	37 – 36	Whitehaven	19 March 2016, 15:00	Mount Pleasant	J Cobb	457
Sheffield Eagles	32 – 28	Swinton Lions	19 March 2016, 15:30	SHU Sports Park	T Grant	412
Toulouse Olympique	62 – 28	Gloucestershire All Golds	19 March 2016, 15:30	Stade Ernest-Argelès	M Woodhead	1,053
Leigh Centurions	68 – 14	Workington Town	19 March 2016, 18:00	Leigh Sports Village	C Kendall	2,049
London Broncos	26 – 48	Featherstone Rovers	19 March 2016, 20:00	Trailfinders Sports Ground	S Ansell	294
Oldham	40 – 6	Kells	20 March 2016, 15:00	Bower Fold	J Bloem	385
Rochdale Hornets	48 – 20	Siddal RLFC	20 March 2016, 15:00	Spotland Stadium	W Turley	653
York City Knights	20 – 12	Keighley Cougars	20 March 2016, 15:00	Bootham Crescent	J Roberts	624

== Fifth round ==
The fifth round draw was made on Tuesday 22 March. This round sees the first entry of Super League clubs when the teams that finished 9th – 12th in the 2015 season are in the draw. The draw was made by Sam Tomkins and Chris Hill (Hill was a late replacement for Sean Long). Ties were played over the weekend of 15–17 April.

Home	Score	Away	Match Information
Home	Score	Away	Date and Time	Venue	Referee	Attendance
Wakefield Trinity Wildcats	44 – 10	Sheffield Eagles	15 April 2016, 20:00	Rapid Solicitors Stadium	Ben Thaler	2,257
Dewsbury Rams	30 – 16	York City Knights	15 April 2016, 20;00	Tetley's Stadium	Andy Sweet	707
Hull Kingston Rovers	22 – 36	Oldham	16 April 2016, 14:00	KC Lightstream Stadium	Sam Ansell	3,056
Toulouse Olympique	10 – 8	Leigh Centurions	16 April 2016 16:00	Stade Ernest-Argelès	Chris Kendall	2,133
Batley Bulldogs	28 – 10	Featherstone Rovers	16 April 2016 17:00	Mount Pleasant	Gareth Hewer	1,461
Rochdale Hornets	6 – 62	Widnes Vikings	17 April 2016, 15:00	Spotland Stadium	James Child	1,242
Hunslet Hawks	14 – 50	Salford Red Devils	17 April 2016, 15:00	South Leeds Stadium	Chris Campbell	834
Halifax	80 – 4	Lock Lane	17 April 2016, 15:00	The MBi Shay	Jamie Bloem	1,108

The tie between Batley and Featherstone was shown live on Sky Sports 5.

== Sixth round ==
The draw for the sixth round was made on 21 April 2016 live on BBC Radio 4 Today programme. The teams were drawn by Today presenter John Humphrys and former England and Great Britain international player Martin Offiah. Ties were played over 6–8 May 2016.

Home	Score	Away	Match Information
Home	Score	Away	Date and Time	Venue	Referee	Attendance
Batley Bulldogs	4 – 40	Catalans Dragons	6 May 2016, 20:00	Fox's Biscuits Stadium	Gareth Hewer	1,249
Huddersfield Giants	36 – 22	Leeds Rhinos	6 May 2016, 20:00	John Smith's Stadium	Ben Thaler	4,979
Castleford Tigers	32 – 18	Salford Red Devils	7 May 2016, 14:30	Wheldon Road	James Child	3,317
Oldham	10 – 70	Warrington Wolves	7 May 2016, 15:00	Bower Fold	Jonathan Roberts	2,394
Wakefield Trinity Wildcats	40 – 22	Toulouse Olympique	8 May 2016, 14:00	Belle Vue	Chris Kendall	2,539
Dewsbury Rams	4 – 54	Wigan Warriors	8 May 2016, 15:00	Tetley's Stadium	Chris Campbell	3,102
Halifax	18 – 28	Widnes Vikings	8 May 2016, 15:00	The MBi Shay	Michael Woodhead	2,032
St. Helens	18 – 47	Hull	8 May 2016, 16:30	Langtree Park	Richard Silverwood	7,094

Sky televised the Batley v Catalans game on Friday 6 May. The BBC broadcast Castleford v Salford on Saturday 7 May and St Helens v Hull on Sunday 8 May.

== Quarter finals ==
The quarter final draw was made after the conclusion of the St Helens vs Hull game, live on BBC 2. The home teams were drawn by Linzi Prescott (widows of Steve Prescott) and the away teams by Tommy Martyn. Ties will be played over the weekend of 23–25 June.

Home	Score	Away	Match Information
Home	Score	Away	Date and Time	Venue	Referee	Attendance
Huddersfield Giants	16 – 28	Wakefield Trinity Wildcats	23 June 2016, 20:00	Galpharm Stadium	Gareth Hewer	3,289
Warrington Wolves	20 – 18	Widnes Vikings	24 June 2016, 20:00	Halliwell Jones Stadium	James Child	7,773
Hull	22 – 8	Catalans Dragons	25 June 2016, 13:30	KC Stadium	Ben Thaler	9,639
Wigan Warriors	26 – 12	Castleford Tigers	25 June 2016, 17:30	DW Stadium	Chris Campbell	8,010

All four matches were broadcast live. The games at Huddersfield and Hull were shown on Sky Sports and the other two games by BBC Sport.

== Semi finals ==
The semi-final draw was made immediately after the Wigan v Castleford quarter final game. The draw was made by Castleford and Leigh player Bob Beardmore and Ian Gildart who played for Wigan, Wakefield Trinity and Oldham.

Home	Score	Away	Match Information
Home	Score	Away	Date and Time	Venue	Referee	Attendance
Wigan Warriors	12 – 16	Hull	29 July 2016, 20:00	Keepmoat Stadium	Ben Thaler	10,488
Warrington Wolves	56 – 12	Wakefield Trinity Wildcats	30 July 2016, 14:30	Leigh Sports Village	Gareth Hewer	10,358

== Final ==
The final was played at Wembley Stadium on Saturday 27 August 2016. Hull were seeking a first ever Challenge Cup victory at Wembley while Warrington were looking for their first win since 2012.

Home	Score	Away	Match Information
Home	Score	Away	Date and Time	Venue	Referee	Attendance
Hull	12 – 10	Warrington Wolves	27 August 2016, 15:00	Wembley Stadium	Gareth Hewer	76,235

In a close fought game Hull came from 10–0 down with only 20 minutes left to play to win 12–10. Hull Scrum-half, Marc Sneyd was voted the winner of the Lance Todd Trophy.

Teams:

Hull: Jamie Shaul, Stevie Michaels, Mahe Fonua, Kirk Yeaman, Fetuli Talanoa, Carlos Tuimavave, Marc Sneyd, Scott Taylor, Danny Houghton, Liam Watts, Sika Manu, Mark Minichiello, Gareth Ellis (captain). Substitutes (all used): Josh Bowden, Frank Pritchard, Danny Washbrook, Chris Green.
Tries: Fonua (1), Shaul (1). Goals: Sneyd (2/2).

Warrington Wolves: Stefan Ratchford, Matty Russell, Toby King, Ryan Atkins, Rhys Evans, Kurt Gidley, Chris Sandow, Chris Hill (captain), Daryl Clark, Ashton Sims, Ben Currie, Jack Hughes, Joe Westerman. Substitutes (all used): George King, Brad Dwyer, Ben Westwood, Ryan Bailey.
Tries: Russell (1), Currie (1). Goals: Gidley (1/3).
