= 2012 Challenge Cup =

Rugby league tournament held in 2012

2012 Carnegie Challenge Cup
- Duration: 9 rounds
- Highest attendance: 79,180
- Broadcast partners: (United Kingdom) BBC Sport
- Winners: Warrington Wolves
- Runners-up: Leeds Rhinos
- Biggest home win: Wigan Warriors 98-4; North Wales Crusaders
- Biggest away win: Myton Warriors 4-94 Halifax
- Lance Todd Trophy: Brett Hodgson

The 2012 Challenge Cup (also known as the Carnegie Challenge Cup for sponsorship reasons) was the 111th staging of the most competitive European rugby league tournament at club level and was open to teams from England, Wales, Scotland and France. It began its preliminary stages in January 2012.

The pools in the preliminary round were dropped.

Wigan Warriors were the reigning champions, but lost 28–39 to Leeds Rhinos in the semi-finals, who avenged last season's final defeat. However, they went on to lose their third consecutive final, the second of which to the Warrington Wolves 18 - 35.

== Preliminary round ==
A total of 44 teams played a preliminary-round tie. The clubs involved included 22 NCL Divisions 1 and 2, 5 regional league winners, the Yorkshire and Lancashire County Cup winners, 1 Cumberland ARL nomination and the British Police. Also in the draw were the Scottish champions and a Welsh representative, 4 teams from the 2011 Rugby League Conference National, 6 Student teams and a North West League representative.

The draw for the preliminary and first round were made on 19 December 2011.

| Home | Score | Away | Match Information |
| Home | Score | Away | Date and Time | Venue | Referee | Attendance |
|---|---|---|---|---|---|---|
| Sharlston Rovers | 1–0 | Edge Hill University | Bye – HWO | Weeland Road |
| Shaw Cross Sharks | 1–0 | Valley Cougars | Bye – HWO | Paul Hinchliffe Memorial Ground |
| Leeds Metropolitan University | 15–14 | Ovenden RLFC | 4 February 2012 13:30 | Milford Sports Club | B Robinson |
| Egremont Rangers | 22–16 | Bank Quay Bulls | 11 February 2012 13:30 | Gillfoot Park | C Braithwaite |
| Kells | 20–14 | Widnes West Bank | 11 February 2012 14:00 | Old Arrowthwaite | M Laing |
| Seaton Rangers | 8–24 | Huddersfield Underbank Rangers | 11 February 2012 14:00 | Station Yard | A Gill |
| Blackbrook Royals | 18–8 | Eccles and Salford Juniors | 12 February 2012 14:00 | Recreation Ground | M Woodhead |
| Millom RLFC | 20–10 | British Police | 12 February 2012 14:00 | Coronation Field | M Hebblethwaite |
| Wigan St Cuthberts | 24–18 | Northumbria University | 12 February 2012 14:00 | Montrose Avenue | S Race |
| Normanton Knights | 32–30 | Milford Marlins | 15 February 2012 19:00 | Queen Elizabeth Drive | C Kendall |
| Castleford Lock Lane | 24–18 | Elland RLFC | 15 February 2012 19:30 | Lock Lane Sports Centre | J Lowery |
| Loughborough University | 22–50 | Hunslet Warriors | 18 February 2012 13:30 | Holywell Park | L Fellows |
| Bradford Dudley Hill | 38–0 | Castleford Panthers | 18 February 2012 13:30 | Neil Hunt Memorial Ground | J Callaghan |
| Warrington Wizards | 18–28 | East Leeds | 18 February 2012 13:30 | Wilderspool Stadium | M Mannifield |
| York Acorn | 42–4 | Norland Sharks | 18 February 2012 13:30 | Acorn Sports and Social Club | C Dean |
| Oldham St Annes | 40–4 | Bentley Good Companions | 18 February 2012 13:30 | Higginshaw Road | M Craven |
| Featherstone Lions | 14–22 | Askam | 18 February 2012 14:00 | Mill Pond Stadium | G Evans |
| Rochdale Mayfield | 14–33 | University of Gloucestershire | 18 February 2012 14:00 | Mayfield Sports Arena | N Aspey |
| Eastmoor Dragons | 22–16 | Wigan St Judes | 18 February 2012 14:00 | King George V Playing Fields | S Ansell |
| Nottingham Outlaws | 0–50 | Hunslet Old Boys | 18 February 2012 16:00 | Harvey Hadden Stadium | T Mather |
| Stanley Rangers | 60–22 | Edinburgh Eagles | 19 February 2012 14:00 | Stanley Sports and Social Club | A Sweet |
| Hull University | 10–68 | Waterhead RLFC | 19 February 2012 14:00 | Cottingham Road | J Roberts |

== Round 1 ==
The 22 winners from the preliminary round then progress to the first round where 11 games were drawn. Due to the number of postponed matches, ties (other than Egremont v Leeds Met and Castleford Lock Lane v Sharlston) were played a week later on 25 February.

| Home | Score | Away | Match Information |
| Home | Score | Away | Date and Time | Venue | Referee | Attendance |
|---|---|---|---|---|---|---|
| Egremont Rangers | 30–6 | Leeds Metropolitan University | 18 February 2012 13:30 | Gillfoot Park | M Laing |
| Castleford Lock Lane | 24–32 | Sharlston Rovers | 18 February 2012 13:30 | Lock Lane Sports Centre | S Mikalauskas |
| Wigan St Cuthberts | 46–22 | Eastmoor Dragons | 25 February 2012 13:30 | Montrose Avenue | M Craven |
| Shaw Cross Sharks | 10–18 | York Acorn | 25 February 2012 14:00 | Paul Hinchliffe Memorial Ground | A Gill |
| Hunslet Warriors | 32–8 | Oldham St Annes | 25 February 2012 14:00 | The Oval | J Roberts |
| Hunslet Old Boys | 26–14 | Waterhead | 25 February 2012 14:00 | Hillidge Road | B Robinson |
| Huddersfield Underbank Rangers | 48–10 | Stanley Rangers | 25 February 2012 14:00 | The Cross Grounds | J Callaghan |
| Blackbrook Royals | 24–20 (aet) | East Leeds | 25 February 2012 14:00 | Recreation Ground | M Laing |
| Millom | 36–8 | University of Gloucestershire | 25 February 2012 14:00 | Coronation Field | C Braithwaite |
| Kells | 34–12 | Normanton Knights | 25 February 2012 14:00 | Old Arrowthwaite | N Aspey |
| Bradford Dudley Hill | 52–12 | Askam | 25 February 2012 14:00 | Neil Hunt Memorial Ground | A Sweet |

== Round 2 ==
The 11 first-round winners then progressed to round two where they met the 14 National Conference League Premier teams and the three Armed Forces teams who entered at this stage to total 28 teams to be drawn into 14 games.

The draw for the second round were made on 27 February 2012 aboard HMS Illustrious and was carried out by Commanding Officer, Captain Martin Connell, who drew the home teams and the away teams were pulled out by England Head Coach Steve McNamara.

The second-round ties were played on the weekend of 10 and 11 March.

| Home | Score | Away | Match Information |
| Home | Score | Away | Date and Time | Venue | Referee | Attendance |
|---|---|---|---|---|---|---|
| East Hull | 32–14 | Royal Air Force | 10 March 2012 13:30 | Rosemead Sports Centre | A Sweet |
| Egremont Rangers | 32–22 | Ince Rose Bridge | 10 March 2012 13:30 | Gillfoot Park | J Roberts |
| Siddal | 62–12 | West Hull | 10 March 2012 14:00 | Siddal Sports & Community Centre | M Hague |
| Hull Dockers | 30–21 | Kells | 10 March 2012 14:00 | The Willows | L Fellows |
| Royal Navy | 32–24 | Leigh Miners Rangers | 10 March 2012 14:00 | United Services Sport Ground | M Mannifield |
| Thatto Heath Crusaders | 32–10 | Millom RLFC | 10 March 2012 14:00 | Hattons Solicitors Crusader Park | P Stockman |
| York Acorn | 26–10 | Skirlaugh RLFC | 10 March 2012 14:00 | Acorn Sports & Social Club | C Hancock |
| Hunslet Old Boys | 16–12 | Blackbrook Royals | 10 March 2012 14:00 | The Hunslet Club | J McMullen |
| Sharlston Rovers | 20–19 | Wigan St Cuthberts | 10 March 2012 14:00 | Sharlston ARLFC | P Marklove |
| Hunslet Warriors | 30–0 | Wigan St Patricks | 10 March 2012 14:30 | The Oval | S Ansell |
| Oulton Raiders | 19–5 | British Army | 10 March 2012 14:30 | Oulton & Woodlesford Sports & Social Club | A Gill |
| Saddleworth Rangers | 18–36 | Myton Warriors | 10 March 2012 14:30 | Shaw Hall Bank Road | M Laing |
| Leigh East | 6–16 | Bradford Dudley Hill | 10 March 2012 14:30 | Leigh East ARLFC | S Mikalauskas |
| Huddersfield Underbank Rangers | 10–24 | Wath Brow Hornets | 11 March 2012 14:00 | The Cross Grounds | M Woodhead |

== Round 3 ==
A total of 14 community clubs would progress to round three, where they would be joined by the Co-operative Championships clubs as well as Toulouse Olympique and Lézignan Sangliers.

Cumbrian Rugby League stars Sol Roper and Rob Purdham conducted the draw for the third round of the Carnegie Challenge Cup at Whitehaven's Recreation Ground on 13 March. Roper, a scrum-half who played in two Wembley finals with Workington Town in 1955 and 1958, drew the home teams and former Whitehaven and London Broncos player Purdham drew the away teams.

| Home | Score | Away | Match Information |
| Home | Score | Away | Date and Time | Venue | Referee | Attendance |
|---|---|---|---|---|---|---|
| Egremont Rangers | 14–22 | Oldham R.L.F.C. | 23 March 2012 20:00 | Recreation Ground^{A} | Joe Cobb | 468 |
| Doncaster | 57–10 | Sharlston Rovers | 24 March 2012 15:00 | Keepmoat Stadium | Chris Leatherbarrow | 496 |
| Gateshead Thunder | 28–10 | York Acorn | 24 March 2012 15:00 | Thunderdome | Peter Brooke | 179 |
| London Skolars | 26–43 | Leigh Centurions | 24 March 2012 15:00 | New River Stadium | Matthew Kidd | 367 |
| Oulton Raiders | 8–58 | Sheffield Eagles | 24 March 2012 15:00 | Rapid Solicitors Stadium^{B} | Warren Turley | 1,020 |
| Wath Brow Hornets | 22–24 | South Wales Scorpions | 24 March 2012 15:00 | Recreation Ground^{A} | J Bloem |
| North Wales Crusaders | 28–10 | Toulouse Olympique | 24 March 2012 19:45 | Racecourse Ground | George Stokes | 567 |
| Bradford Dudley Hill | 6–58 | Keighley Cougars | 25 March 2012 14:00 | Cougar Park^{C} | B Robinson | 840 |
| Hunslet Old Boys | 12–86 | Featherstone Rovers | 25 March 2012 14:00 | Bigfellas Stadium^{D} | Tom Crashley | 785 |
| Hunslet Hawks | 34–14 | Royal Navy | 25 March 2012 14:00 | South Leeds Stadium | Ronnie Laughton | 302 |
| Swinton Lions | 66–0 | Siddal | 25 March 2012 14:00 | Leigh Sports Village | D Sharpe | 404 |
| Barrow Raiders | 32–22 | Lézignan Sangliers | 25 March 2012 15:00 | Craven Park | Greg Dolan | 1,340 |
| Dewsbury Rams | 84–12 | Thatto Heath Crusaders | 25 March 2012 15:00 | Tetley's Stadium | C Kendall | 606 |
| East Hull | 20–48 | Rochdale Hornets | 25 March 2012 15:00 | Spotland Stadium^{E} | Dave Merrick | 303 |
| Myton Warriors | 4–94 | Halifax | 25 March 2012 15:00 | The Shay^{F} | J Callaghan | 1,011 |
| Whitehaven | 52–6 | Hunslet Warriors | 25 March 2012 15:00 | Recreation Ground | Scott Mikalauskas |
| Workington Town | 6–22 | Batley Bulldogs | 25 March 2012 15:00 | Derwent Park | Jamie Leahy | 601 |
| York City Knights | 40–14 | Hull Dockers | 25 March 2012 15:00 | Huntington Stadium | Gareth Hewer | 346 |

Notes

A. Game switched to Recreation Ground (Whitehaven)
B. Game switched to Rapid Solicitors Stadium (Wakefield)
C. Game switched to Cougar Park (Keighley)
D. Game switched to Bigfellas Stadium (Featherstone)
E. Game switched to Spotland (Rochdale)
F. Game switched to The Shay (Halifax)

== Round 4 ==
The draw for round 4 took place at 8.50pm on 26 March 2012 and was conducted by Challenge Cup winners Andy Gregory and Lee Crooks. The games took place over the weekend of 13, 14 and 15 April 2012 with BBC Sport showing the tie between Widnes Vikings and St. Helens and for the first time Sky Sports televised the Featherstone Rovers v Castleford Tigers.

| Home | Score | Away | Match Information |
| Home | Score | Away | Date and Time | Venue | Referee | Attendance |
|---|---|---|---|---|---|---|
| Leeds Rhinos | 38–18 | Wakefield Trinity Wildcats | 13 April 2012 20:00 | Headingley Carnegie Stadium | R Silverwood | 7,140 |
| Swinton Lions | 70–10 | Gateshead Thunder | 14 April 2012 14:00 | Leigh Sports Village | W Turley | 415 |
| Featherstone Rovers | 23–16 | Castleford Tigers | 14 April 2012 15:00 | Bigfellas Stadium | B Thaler | 4,165 |
| South Wales Scorpions | 28–84 | Halifax | 14 April 2012 15:00 | The Shay | R Hicks | 879 |
| Widnes Vikings | 38–40 | St. Helens | 14 April 2012 17:30 | Stobart Stadium | J Child | 3,069 |
| Keighley Cougars | 18–44 | Warrington Wolves | 15 April 2012 14:00 | Cougar Park | T Roby | 2,196 |
| London Broncos | 72–4 | Dewsbury Rams | 15 April 2012 14:00 | Twickenham Stoop | M Tomason | 652 |
| Bradford Bulls | 72–6 | Doncaster | 15 April 2012 15:00 | Odsal Stadium | J Leahy | 3,210 |
| Hull F.C. | 16–42 | Huddersfield Giants | 15 April 2012 15:00 | KC Stadium | T Alibert | 8,327 |
| Hull Kingston Rovers | 18–20 | Catalans Dragons | 15 April 2012 15:00 | MS3 Craven Park | P Bentham | 7,000 |
| Hunslet Hawks | 18–21 | Batley Bulldogs | 15 April 2012 15:00 | South Leeds Stadium | G Hewer | 664 |
| Leigh Centurions | 68–18 | Rochdale Hornets | 15 April 2012 15:00 | Leigh Sports Village | C Leatherbarrow | 1,229 |
| Oldham R.L.F.C. | 26–14 | Barrow Raiders | 15 April 2012 15:00 | Whitebank Stadium | D Merrick | 773 |
| Whitehaven | 18–58 | Salford City Reds | 15 April 2012 15:00 | Recreation Ground | S Ganson | 751 |
| Wigan Warriors | 98–4 | North Wales Crusaders | 15 April 2012 15:00 | DW Stadium | G Stokes | 4,198 |
| York City Knights | 12–50 | Sheffield Eagles | 15 April 2012 15:00 | Huntington Stadium | R Laughton | 551 |

== Round 5 ==
The draw, which took place at 3:00pm on 16 April 2012 had an Olympic and Paralympic theme with the last 16 teams drawn by two athletes who were hoping for medal success at London 2012, Johanna Jackson and Louis Speight. Round 5 took place over the weekend of 28 and 29 April 2012,

| Home | Score | Away | Match Information |
| Home | Score | Away | Date and Time | Venue | Referee | Attendance |
|---|---|---|---|---|---|---|
| Oldham R.L.F.C. | 0–76 | St. Helens | 27 April 2012 20:00 | Langtree Park | B Thaler | 5,742 |
| Featherstone Rovers | 16–32 | Wigan Warriors | 27 April 2012 20:00 | Bigfellas Stadium | R Silverwood | 4,082 |
| Warrington Wolves | 32–16 | Bradford Bulls | 28 April 2012 14:40 | Halliwell Jones Stadium | J Child | 5,505 |
| Catalans Dragons | 68–6 | Sheffield Eagles | 28 April 2012 18:30 CET | Stade Gilbert Brutus | R Hicks | 7,000 |
| Leigh Centurions | 19–18 | Halifax | 29 April 2012 14:00 | Leigh Sports Village | P Bentham | 2,182 |
| Batley Bulldogs | 16–22 | London Broncos | 29 April 2012 14:00 | Mount Pleasant | T Alibert | 1,025 |
| Salford City Reds | 10–16 | Leeds Rhinos | 29 April 2012 15:00 | City of Salford Stadium | S Ganson |
| Huddersfield Giants | 52–0 | Swinton Lions | 29 April 2012 15:00 | Galpharm Stadium | T Roby | 2,617 |

== Quarter finals ==
The quarter finals took place over the weekend of 12 and 13 May 2012. Two games were shown live on the BBC and one on Sky Sports. The draw took place on 1 May 2012 at 8:20am BST, and was broadcast on BBC Radio 5 Live.

| Home | Score | Away | Match Information |
| Home | Score | Away | Date and Time | Venue | Referee | Attendance |
|---|---|---|---|---|---|---|
| Leigh Centurions | 12–60 | Leeds Rhinos | 11 May 2012 20:00 | Leigh Sports Village | Ben Thaler | 5,290 |
| Wigan Warriors | 18–4 | St. Helens | 12 May 2012 14:30 | DW Stadium | Richard Silverwood | 12,864 |
| Catalans Dragons | 22–32 | Warrington Wolves | 13 May 2012 16:10 CEST | Stade Gilbert Brutus | Steve Ganson | 11,000 |
| Huddersfield Giants | 50–14 | London Broncos | 13 May 2012 17:00 | Galpharm Stadium | James Child | 2,574 |

== Semi finals ==
The semi-finals took place on 14 and 15 July 2012 at neutral venues and both games were televised by the BBC. The draw took place on 13 May after the Catalans-Warrington match on BBC Two with the draw made by Ian Millward and Brian Noble

14 July 2012
17:30 BST

| Leeds Rhinos | 39–28 | Wigan Warriors |

Galpharm Stadium, Huddersfield
Attendance: 12,860
Referee: Ben Thaler

15 July 2012
17:45 BST^{A}

| Warrington Wolves | 33–6 | Huddersfield Giants |

Salford City Stadium, Salford
Attendance: 9,473
Referee: Richard Silverwood

Note:
A. Match originally scheduled for 17:30 kick-off, but was delayed by 15 minutes due to BBC's coverage of Scottish Open golf over-running.

== Final ==
The final was played on 25 August 2012 at Wembley Stadium with a 14:30 kick off time and was shown live on BBC One. The game was a repeat of the 2010 Challenge Cup final, where Warrington beat Leeds 30–6. In the final the Warrington Wolves won the Challenge Cup for a third time in four years, beating Leeds 35–18.

25 August 2012
14:30

| Leeds Rhinos | 18–35 | Warrington Wolves |

Wembley Stadium, London
Attendance: 79,180
Referee: Richard Silverwood

Teams:

Warrington: Brett Hodgson, Chris Riley, Ryan Atkins, Stefan Ratchford, Joel Monaghan, Lee Briers, Richie Myler, Garreth Carvell, Mickey Higham, Chris Hill, Trent Waterhouse, Ben Westwood, Ben Harrison
Replacements: Adrian Morley (c), Michael Monaghan, Paul Wood, Tyrone McCarthy Coach: Tony Smith
Tries: Monaghan, Waterhouse, Riley, Atkins, McCarthy, Hogdson. Goals: Hodgson (5).

Leeds: Zak Hardaker, Ben Jones-Bishop, Kallum Watkins, Carl Ablett, Ryan Hall, Kevin Sinfield (c), Stevie Ward, Kylie Leuluai, Rob Burrow, Jamie Peacock, Jamie Jones-Buchanan, Brett Delaney, Ryan Bailey
Replacements: Ian Kirke, Shaun Lunt, Darrell Griffin, Jimmy Keinhorst Coach: Brian McDermott
Tries: Kirke, Watkins (2) Goals: Sinfield (3).

== UK Broadcasting rights ==
The tournament was jointly televised by the BBC and Sky Sports on the first of their five-year contracts.

| Round | Live match | Date | BBC channel |
|---|---|---|---|
| Round 4 | Widnes Vikings 38 - 40 St. Helens | 14 April 2012 | BBC Two* |
| Round 5 | Warrington Wolves 32 - 16 Bradford Bulls | 18 April 2012 | BBC One |
| Quarter finals | Wigan Warriors 18 - 4 St. Helens; Catalans Dragons 22 - 32 Warrington Wolves | 12 May 2012; 13 May 2012 | BBC One; BBC Two |
| Semi finals | Leeds Rhinos 39 - 28 Wigan Warriors; Warrington Wolves 33 - 6 Huddersfield Giants | 14 July 2012; 15 July 2012 | BBC Two & BBC HD |
| Final | Leeds Rhinos 18 - 35 Warrington Wolves | 25 August 2012 | BBC One |

- Only in England and Wales.

Sky Sports televised the round-4 match between Featherstone Rovers and Castleford Tigers on 12 April 2012 and the round-5 match between Featherstone Rovers and Wigan Warriors on 27 April 2012 as well as a quarter-final.
