= 2010 Challenge Cup =

Rugby league competition

2010 Carnegie Challenge Cup
- Duration: 9 Rounds
- Highest attendance: 85,217
- Broadcast partners: (United Kingdom) BBC Sport
- Winners: Warrington Wolves
- Runners-up: Leeds Rhinos
- Biggest home win: Oldham 80–6 Blackwood Bulldogs
- Biggest away win: Ovenden 10–88 Halifax
- Lance Todd Trophy: Lee Briers

The 2010 Challenge Cup (also known as the Carnegie Challenge Cup for sponsorship reasons) was the 109th staging of the most competitive European rugby league tournament at club level and was open to teams from England, Wales, Scotland, France and Russia. It began its preliminary stages on 2 January 2010.

Warrington Wolves successfully defended their title after beating Leeds Rhinos 30 – 6 in the final.

== Preliminary round ==
The draw for the preliminary round was divided into two pools, separating amateur teams from university, police, Armed Services and regional champion teams. Lee Briers and Michael Monaghan, who both played for the Warrington Wolves team which won the 2009 Challenge Cup Final, made the draw at Leeds Metropolitan University.

=== Pool A ===
Home	Score	Away	Match Information
Home	Score	Away	Date and Time	Venue	Referee	Attendance
Leigh Miners Rangers	26–14	Millom RLFC	23 January 2010
York Acorn	18–12	Skirlaugh	17 January 2010
Orchard Park & Greenwood	0–72	Wath Brow Hornets	16 January 2010
Waterhead ARLFC	10–32	Drighlington ARLFC	23 January 2010
Egremont Rangers	8–36	Oulton Raiders	17 January 2010
Widnes St Maries	24–43	Myton Warriors ARLFC	23 January 2010
Sharlston Rovers	12–20	Leigh East	17 January 2010		Tony Mahar
Oldham St Annes	12–13	Wigan St Judes	23 January 2010
West Bowling	12–20	Normanton Knights	23 January 2010
Wigan St Patricks	28–6	Broughton Red Rose	23 January 2010

- An additional twenty-six teams were granted byes into the first round as a result of the draw.

=== Pool B ===
Home	Score	Away	Match Information
Home	Score	Away	Date and Time	Venue	Referee	Attendance
Nottingham Outlaws	34–20	Hull University	24 Jan 2010 13:30
Warrington Wizards	46–4	Birmingham University	24 Jan 2010 15:00	Wilderspool Stadium
Leeds Metropolitan University	18–0	St Mary's University	Match cancelled

- An additional ten teams were granted byes into the first round as a result of the draw.

== Round 1 ==
The draw for Round 1 was made immediately after the draw for the preliminary round. Ties were played on 23 & 24 January 2010.

=== Pool A ===
Home	Score	Away	Match Information
Home	Score	Away	Date and Time	Venue	Referee	Attendance
Wath Brow Hornets	14–6	Kells	23 January 2010
Stanningley SARLFC	0–22	Wigan St Judes	6 February 2010
Bradford Dudley Hill	18–20	Castleford Panthers	23 January 2010	Neil Hunt Memorial Ground
Castleford Lock Lane	34–10	Thornhill Trojans	23 January 2010
Shaw Cross Sharks ARLFC	8–44	Leigh Miners Rangers	6 February 2010
Crosfields ARLFC	12–22	Rochdale Mayfield	23 January 2010
Ince Rose Bridge	26–30	Oulton Raiders	23 January 2010
Milford Marlins	28–12	Eastmoor Dragons	23 January 2010
Heworth	0–56	Hunslet Warriors	23 January 2010
Saddleworth Rangers	8–22	Siddal	23 January 2010
York Acorn	32–36	Thatto Heath Crusaders	23 January 2010
East Hull	36–12	Stanley Rangers	23 January 2010
Eccles & Salford Juniors	14–42	Leigh East	23 January 2010
Hull Dockers	26–12	Pilkington Recs	6 February 2010
Normanton Knights	6–4	Wigan St Patricks	6 February 2010
East Leeds	0–8	Ovenden ARLFC	23 January 2010
Drighlington ARLFC	26–10	West Hull ARLFC	6 February 2010
Myton Warriors	20–15	Halton Simms Cross	6 February 2010

=== Pool B ===
Home	Score	Away	Match Information
Home	Score	Away	Date and Time	Venue	Referee	Attendance
RAF	24–28	Warrington Wizards	31 January 2010 11:30	RAF Cranwell
British Police	46–16	Dewsbury Celtic	24 January 2010
West London Sharks	16–38	Nottingham Outlaws	7 February 2010
Featherstone Lions	16–24	The Army	23 January 2010
Leeds Metropolitan University	28–4	Loughborough University	24 January 2010
Gloucestershire University	32–36	Edinburgh Eagles	24 January 2010
Northumbria University	4–54	Royal Navy	24 January 2010
Blackwood Bulldogs	42–16	Edge Hill University	24 January 2010

== Round 2 ==
The draw for Round 2 was made on 26 January 2010. Ties were played on 13 & 14 February 2010.

=== Pool A ===
Home	Score	Away	Match Information
Home	Score	Away	Date and Time	Venue	Referee	Attendance
Wigan St Judes	36–18	Milford Marlins	13 February 2010
Rochdale Mayfield	18–34	Leigh East	13 February 2010
Castleford Panthers	0–32	Thatto Heath Crusaders	13 February 2010
Ovenden RLFC	32–16	Myton Warriors	13 February 2010
Wath Brow Hornets	16–14	East Hull	13 February 2010
Siddal	34–30	Oulton Raiders	13 February 2010
Drighlington RLFC	24–18	Castleford Lock Lane	13 February 2010
Normanton Knights	8–14	Hunslet Warriors	13 February 2010
Hull Dockers	8–24	Leigh Miners Rangers	13 February 2010

=== Pool B ===
Home	Score	Away	Match Information
Home	Score	Away	Date and Time	Venue	Referee	Attendance
British Police	18–50	Leeds Metropolitan University	14 February 2010 14:00	Siddal
Warrington Wizards	28–20	The Army	14 February 2010 14:00	Wilderspool Stadium
Edinburgh Eagles	16–28	Blackwood Bulldogs	14 February 2010 12:30
Royal Navy	46–6	Nottingham Outlaws	13 February 2010 14:30

== Round 3 ==
The draw for Round 3 was made on 16 February. Ties were played on 6–8 March.

Home	Score	Away	Match Information
Home	Score	Away	Date and Time	Venue	Referee	Attendance
Widnes Vikings	64–12	Wigan St Judes	9 March 2010	Stobart Stadium	C Leatherbarrow	1,622
Oldham	80–6	Blackwood Bulldogs	7 March 2010	Sedgley Park	Tim Roby	455
Gateshead Thunder	12–44	York City Knights	7 March 2010	Gateshead International Stadium	Craig Halloran	336
London Skolars	16–42	Limoux Grizzlies	7 March 2010	New River Stadium	Peter Brooke	450
Doncaster	0–26	Siddal	6 March 2010 14:00	Keepmoat Stadium	Ronnie Laughton	285
Rochdale Hornets	22–32	Lézignan Sangliers	7 March 2010	Spotland Stadium	Robert Hicks	398
Drighlington RLFC	10–42	Dewsbury Rams	7 March 2010	Tetley's Stadium	Dave Merrick	1,222
Batley Bulldogs	70–6	Leeds Metropolitan University	7 March 2010	Mount Pleasant	Jamie Leahy	502
Royal Navy	12–50	Blackpool Panthers	7 March 2010	United Services Recreation Ground	Bob Everitt	250
Featherstone Rovers	74–0	Workington Town	7 March 2010	Post Office Road	Matthew Thomasson	1,215
Warrington Wizards	22–34	Swinton Lions	5 March 2010	Wilderspool Stadium	Brandon Robinson	430
Leigh Miners Rangers	20–40	Whitehaven	5 March 2010	Leigh Sports Village	Warren Turley	350
Sheffield Eagles	54–0	Thatto Heath Crusaders	7 March 2010 15:00	Don Valley Stadium	Greg Dolan	502
Ovenden	10–88	Halifax	7 March 2010	Shay Stadium	Clint Sharrad	2,319
Barrow Raiders	62–10	Hunslet Warriors	7 March 2010	Craven Park	George Stokes	1,330
Keighley Cougars	26–35	Toulouse Olympique	6 March 2010 18:00	Cougar Park	Gareth Hewer	543
Leigh East	14–30	Hunslet Hawks	6 March 2010 15:00	Leigh Sports Village	Matthew Kidd	694
Leigh Centurions	52–4	Wath Brow Hornets	7 March 2010	Leigh Sports Village	Tom Crashley	1,382

== Round 4 ==
The draw for Round 4 was made on 8 March. Ties were played on 16–18 April.

Home	Score	Away	Match Information
Home	Score	Away	Date and Time	Venue	Referee	Attendance
York City Knights	8–58	Crusaders	18 April 2010 15:00	Huntington Stadium	M Thomason	719
Hunslet Hawks	42–12	Oldham	18 April 2010 15:00	South Leeds Stadium	C Halloran	509
Swinton Lions	4–56	Halifax	16 April 2010 20:00	Sedgley Park	T Roby	633
Limoux Grizzlies	20–32	Leigh Centurions	17 April 2010 15:00	Stade de l'Aiguille	W Turley	2,000
Harlequins	23–16	Wakefield Trinity Wildcats	17 April 2010 15:00	The Stoop	Phil Bentham	2,355
St. Helens	56–16	Toulouse Olympique	17 April 2010 18:00	Knowsley Road	G Hewer	4,043
Widnes Vikings	44–24	Lézignan Sangliers	22 April 2010 19:30	Stobart Stadium	Ronnie Laughton	1,349
Catalans Dragons	30–8	Salford City Reds	18 April 2010 14:00	Stade Gilbert Brutus	James Child	5,238
Sheffield Eagles	34–50	Wigan Warriors	17 April 2010 16:00	Bramall Lane	Ian Smith	2,950
Siddal	2–34	Batley Bulldogs	18 April 2010 15:00	The Shay	D Merrick	1,926
Hull	24–48	Leeds Rhinos	17 April 2010 14:30	Kingston Communications Stadium	Richard Silverwood	15,109
Castleford Tigers	28–34	Barrow Raiders	18 April 2010 15:30	The Jungle	Thierry Alibert	5,285
Warrington Wolves	48–24	Featherstone Rovers	18 April 2010 16:00	Halliwell Jones Stadium	R Hicks	7,754
Blackpool Panthers	24–18	Whitehaven	18 April 2010 15:00	Woodlands Memorial Ground	G Dolan	471
Huddersfield Giants	40–12	Hull Kingston Rovers	18 April 2010 13:45	Galpharm Stadium	Richard Silverwood	7,241
Dewsbury Rams	0–50	Bradford Bulls	18 April 2010 15:20	Tetley's Stadium	Peter Brooke	3,995

== Round 5 ==
The draw for Round 5 was made on 18 April. Ties were played on 7–9 May. The game between Halifax and Batley Bulldogs was postponed due to Halifax being suspected of fielding an ineligible player – Michael Ostick – who played for Rochdale Hornets in the third round. Despite being cup-tied, the Rugby Football League found that he played for Halifax in round four against Swinton Lions. The Lions were reinstated and Halifax removed from the competition, with their head coach Matt Calland being suspended by the club.

Home	Score	Away	Match Information
Home	Score	Away	Date and Time	Venue	Referee	Attendance
Swinton Lions	6–58	Batley Bulldogs	19 May 2010 19:00	Sedgley Park	Robert Hicks	636
Leeds Rhinos	70–22	Blackpool Panthers	7 May 2010 20:00	Headingley	Gareth Hewer	5,316
Barrow Raiders	42–24	Hunslet Hawks	9 May 2010 15:30	Craven Park	Ronnie Laughton	2,241
Bradford Bulls	58–16	Leigh Centurions	7 May 2010 20:00	Grattan Stadium	Thierry Alibert	4,250
Harlequins	10–30	St. Helens	9 May 2010 14:00	The Stoop	Ben Thaler	3,381
Crusaders	34–35	Catalans Dragons	9 May 2010 15:30	Racecourse Ground	Ian Smith	1,817
Huddersfield Giants	4–60	Warrington Wolves	8 May 2010 14:30	Galpharm Stadium	P Bentham	6,641
Widnes Vikings	10–64	Wigan Warriors	8 May 2010 19:30	Stobart Stadium	J Child	5,504

== Quarter-finals ==
The draw for the Quarter-finals was made on 9 May. Ties were played on 28–30 May.

Home	Score	Away	Match Information
Home	Score	Away	Date and Time	Venue	Referee	Attendance
Batley Bulldogs	12–74	Catalans Dragons	30 May 2010 15:00	Mount Pleasant	Ian Smith	2,132
Leeds Rhinos	12–10	Wigan Warriors	29 May 2010 14:30	Headingley	P Bentham	9,242
St. Helens	32–12	Barrow Raiders	29 May 2010 15:00	GPW Recruitment Stadium	James Child	4,972
Bradford Bulls	22–26	Warrington Wolves	30 May 2010 15:30	Grattan Stadium	R Silverwood	7,092

== Semi-finals ==
The draw for the Semi-finals was made on 2 June 2010. Ties were played on 7 and 8 August 2010.

7 August 2010
14:30

St. Helens	28–32	Leeds Rhinos

Galpharm Stadium
Attendance: 15,267
Referee: Phil Bentham

8 August 2010
15:30

Warrington Wolves	54–12	Catalans Dragons

Stobart Stadium
Attendance: 12,265
Referee: Richard Silverwood

== Final ==
On 20 August 2010, the Rugby Football League announced that it had sold its allocation of 72,000 tickets for the match which is set to be one of the most anticipated cup finals of recent years.

The final was played at Wembley Stadium on 28 August.

Chris Hicks of Warrington Wolves scored the first hat-trick in a Challenge Cup Final in the new Wembley stadium as the Wolves ran away 30–6 winners. It was 14–0 to the Wolves at half-time

28 August 2010
14:30

Leeds Rhinos	6–30	Warrington Wolves

Wembley Stadium
Attendance: 85,217
Referee: Richard Silverwood

Teams:

Warrington: Richard Mathers, Chris Hicks, Matt King, Ryan Atkins, Chris Riley, Lee Briers, Michael Monaghan, Adrian Morley (c), Jon Clarke, Garreth Carvell, Louis Anderson, Ben Westwood, Ben Harrison
Replacements: Paul Wood, David Solomona, Mickey Higham, Vinnie Anderson Coach: Tony Smith
Tries: Hicks (3), Atkins (2), Anderson. Goals: Westwood (3).

Leeds: Brent Webb, Lee Smith, Brett Delaney, Keith Senior, Ryan Hall, Danny McGuire, Rob Burrow, Kylie Leuluai, Danny Buderus, Chris Clarkson, Jamie Jones-Buchanan, Ryan Bailey, Kevin Sinfield (c),
Replacements: Ian Kirke, Matt Diskin, Greg Eastwood, Carl Ablett Coach: Brian McClennan
Tries: Smith Goals: Sinfield.

== UK Broadcasting rights ==
Selected matches were televised solely by the BBC.

Round	Live match	Date	BBC channel
Round 4	Hull F.C. 24 – 48 Leeds Rhinos; Huddersfield Giants 40 – 12 Hull Kingston Rovers	17 April 2010; 18 April 2010	BBC One; BBC Two
Round 5	Huddersfield Giants 4 – 60 Warrington Wolves; Crusaders 34 – 35 Catalans Dragons	8 May 2010; 9 May 2010	BBC One^{1} BBC Two
Quarter-finals	Leeds Rhinos 12 – 10 Wigan Warriors; Bradford Bulls 22 – 26 Warrington Wolves	29 May 2010; 30 May 2010	BBC One; BBC Two^{2}
Semi-finals	St. Helens 28 – 32 Leeds Rhinos; Warrington Wolves 54 – 12 Catalans Dragons	7 Aug 2010; 8 Aug 2010	BBC One; BBC Two
Final	Leeds Rhinos 6 – 30 Warrington Wolves	28 Aug 2010	BBC One & BBC HD

^{1} Coverage in Northern Ireland, Scotland and Wales started half an hour later.

^{2} Coverage in Northern Ireland started forty five minutes later.
