= Ian Smith (rugby league) =

English rugby league referee

Personal information
- Born: 7 December 1965 (age 60) Oldham, Lancashire, England

Refereeing information
| Years | Competition | Apps |
| 1999–10 | Super League |
| 2007–10 | Challenge Cup |
- Source: As of 8 May 2010

Ian Smith (born 7 December 1965) is a former Super League referee. He was one of the Full Time Match Officials' coaches.

== Background ==
Smith was born in Oldham, Lancashire, England.

== Domestic career ==
Smith officiated in the Super League competition.

His first pro game was Blackpool v Bramley in 1998.

His first Super League game was the London Broncos versus the Salford City Reds on 7 August 1999.

=== Super League ===
In 2008, Ian Smith famously sent off Gareth Hock for manhandling him. Hock was suspended 5 matches and missed the rest of 2008's Super League XIII season.

=== Co-operative Championship ===
He was Northern Ford Premiership's referee of the year in 1999 and 2000.

== International career ==
- Ian Smith was the video referee for England VS France on 24 October 2009 in the 4 Nations.
- He is the video referee for Scotland VS Lebanon on 1 November 2009 in the Rugby League European Cup.
- He is the video referee for France VS Australia on 7 November 2009 in the 4 Nations.
