= Great Britain Police Rugby League =

Great Britain Police

Club information
- Full name: Great Britain Police Rugby League
- Short name: British Police, GBP
- Colours: red and navy blue

Current details
- Ground: Mayfield Sports Centre
- Competition: Challenge Cup

Great Britain Police Rugby League, (sometimes referred in Rugby League media to as British Police or GB Police,) is a British rugby league team representing the police forces in the United Kingdom. The team have regularly played in the Challenge Cup since 2010. They usually play their home games groundsharing with Rochdale Mayfield at Mayfield Sports Centre in Rochdale, Greater Manchester. Playing membership is only open to serving members of the police.

== History ==
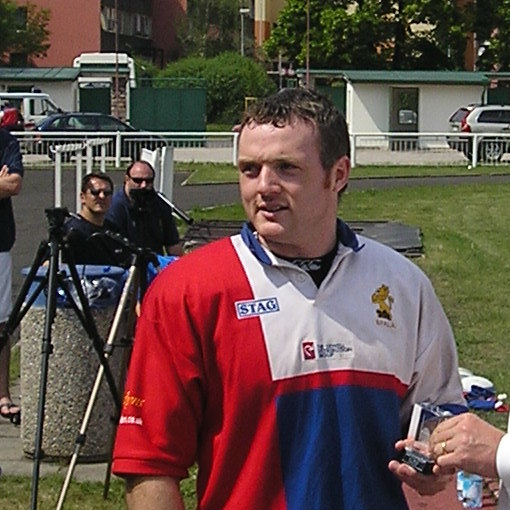
Police kit

A rugby league team representing the British Police had been around since the 1990s. They would mostly play matches against overseas police representative teams. The individual county forces play inter-police rugby league matches which determine selection for the Great Britain Police team.

The majority of the Great Britain Police team come from serving officers from rugby league's heartland forces of Yorkshire as well as Lancashire Constabulary but team members also come from non-heartland police forces such as London's Metropolitan Police and Leicestershire Constabulary. The Great Britain Police team played in their first Challenge Cup in 2010, joining the British Army, Royal Navy and Royal Air Force teams as the uniformed services representatives in the competition. Their first manager for the Challenge Cup was Jon Hamer, whom had played for Bradford Bulls in the 1996 Challenge Cup Final against St. Helens. Though the Great Britain Police team do not compete in the British rugby league pyramid, they do partake in international tours as well as the Inter-Forces Competition against the British Army, Royal Navy and Royal Air Force. They also take part in a Tri-Nations competition against the representative teams of the Australian Federal Police and the New Zealand Police.

=== Challenge Cup ===
Year	2010	2011	2012	2013	2014	2015	2016	2017	2018	2019	2020	2021	2022	2023	2024	2025
Round	R2	R1	—N/a	—N/a	R2	R1	R1	R1	R1	R2	R2	—N/a	R1	R2	—N/a	R1
