= York Acorn =

Amateur rugby league club in York, England

York Acorn A.R.L.F.C.

Club information
- Nickname: "The Corn"
- Colours: Blue jersey with gold bar, blue shorts and socks
- Founded: 1973
- Website: Official website

Current details
- Ground: Acorn Sports & Social Club, Thanet Road ,Acomb, York YO24 2NW
- Competition: NCRL National Premier League

York Acorn A.R.L.F.C. are an amateur Rugby League club who currently play in the NCRL National Premier League in the UK. Their home ground is the Acorn Sports & Social Club on Thanet Road in the Acomb suburb of York.

== History ==
York Acorn was formed in August 1973 and named after a public house, "The Ackhorne", in the centre of the city of York. It moved to its current ground in 1990 and opened its club house on 19 January 1991.

The rugby section maintains control of the day-to-day running of the sports & social club as other sports, such as football and running, are based at the club. In 2011 the club were awarded Sport England's Gold Clubmark for being child friendly.

York Acorn were founder members of the National Conference League in 1993 having been elected to Division 2 from their regional league. This three-division league replaced the BARLA National League. The club would not achieve promotion from the bottom tier until the 2004–05 season.

== Seasons ==
Results from before the establishment of the National Conference League are not recorded due to lack of sources. After 2011 they were available from a variety of reputable sources

=== League ===
Year	League	Lvl	Pld	W	D	L	PF	PA	PD	Pts	Position
2011–12	National Conference Premier	4	26	5	1	20	471	805	–334	11	14th R
2012	National Conference Division 1	6*	26	19	0	7	701	509	192	38	3rd P
2013	National Conference Premier	5	26	7	1	18	575	670	−95	15	12th R
2014	National Conference Division 1	6	22	9	2	11	506	536	−30	20	7th
2015	National Conference Division 1	5	26	14	2	10	814	633	181	30	5th P (Note: Promoted via playoffs)
2016	National League Premier	5	22	3	0	19	425	745	–320	6	12th R
2017	National Conference Division 1	6	20	10	0	10	516	446	70	20	5th
2018	National Conference Division 1	6	22	11	1	10	552	544	8	23	7th
2019	National Conference Division 1	6	22	16	1	5	706	371	335	33	2nd P
2020	National Conference Premier	5	2	0	1	1	54	58	−4	1	9th (Note: League suspended due to pandemic)
2021	League G	5	13	9	0	4	305	185	120	18	3rd
2022	National Conference Premier	5	22	7	1	14	404	552	−148	15	8th
2023	National Conference Premier	5	22	9	1	12	502	485	17	19	7th
2024	National Conference Premier	5	22	13	0	10	420	493	–73	20	6th

=== Challenge Cup ===
Year	Round	Home	Away	Score
1993–94	1	York Acorn	Orell St James	32–32
1993–94	1	Orrell St James	York Acorn	24–5
1994–95	1	York Acorn	Crown Malet	18–25
1996	Did not enter			
1997	1	York Acorn	Fryston	22–12
1997	2	York Acorn	Mayfield	7–20
1998	1	Millom	York Acorn	22–2
1999	1	Oulton	York Acorn	42–8
2000	Did not enter			
2001	1	York Acorn	Halton Simms Cross	0–18
2002	1	York Acorn	Dewsbury Moor	34–32
2002	2	York Acorn	Heworth	14–16
2003	1	Redhill	York Acorn	24–12
2004	Did not enter			
2005	1	York Acorn	East Hull	12–64
2006	1	York Acorn	Ince Rose Bridge	29–22
2006	2	York Acorn	Seaton Rangers	35–16
2006	3	Hull Kingston Rovers	York Acorn	62–1
2007	1	Siddal A.R.L.F.C.	York Acorn	18–14
2008	1	Hull Wyke	York Acorn	18–40 (Note: Some sources show a 18–14 win for Hull Wyke, but this is not correct)
2008	2	York Acorn	Bradford Dudley Hill	14–6
2008	3	Rochdale Hornets	York Acorn	50–8
2009	1	Halton Simms Cross	York Acorn	46–12
2010	1 Pool A	York Acorn	Skirlaugh A.R.L.F.C.	18–12
2010	2 Pool A	York Acorn	Thatto Heath Crusaders	32–36
2011	1 Pool A	York Acorn	Milford Marlins	24–35
2012	Preliminary	York Acorn	Norland Sharks	42–4
2012	1	Shaw Cross Sharks	York Acorn	10–18
2012	2	York Acorn	Skirlaugh A.R.L.F.C.	26–10
2012	3	Gateshead Thunder	York Acorn	28–10
2013	1	Normanton Knights	York Acorn	48–16
2014	1	York Acorn	Siddal A.R.L.F.C.	12–16
2015	1	Shaw Cross Sharks	York Acorn	18–16
2016	1	York Acorn	Sharlston Rovers	36–20
2016	2	York Acorn	Distington	28–10
2016	3	York City Knights	York Acorn	66–0
2017	1	RAF	York Acorn	12–30
2017	2	Myton Warriors	York Acorn	18–4
2018	1	York Acorn	Askam RLFC	16–32
2019	1	York Acorn	Beverley	42–4
2019	2	Wath Brow Hornets	York Acorn	8–9
2019	3	York Acorn	Featherstone Lions	10–20
2020	1	York Acorn	Hammersmith Hills Hoists	36–14
2020	2	York Acorn	Barrow Island	34–14
2020	3	Rochdale Hornets	York Acorn	54–10
2021	Only professional clubs entered due to ongoing pandemic			
2022	1	Edinburgh Eagles	York Acorn	24–38
2022	2	York Acorn	Wests Warriors	28–10
2022	3	Royal Navy	York Acorn	22–8
2023	1	RAF	York Acorn	10–12
2023	2	Bradford Bulls	York Acorn	62–6
2024	1	Orell St James	York Acorn	12–22
2024	2	Cornwall R.L.F.C.	York Acorn	10–18
2024	3	York Acorn	Wath Brow Hornets	32–28
2024	4	Halifax Panthers	York Acorn	62–6
2025	1	GB Police	York Acorn	4–52
2025	2	York Acorn	Oulton Raiders	22-2
2025	3	York Acorn	Hull F.C.	6-52
2026	1	Hunslet RLFC	York Acorn	48-6

== Notable former players ==
- Peter Fox (born 5 November 1984) is an English former professional rugby league footballer who played in the 2000s and 2010s.
- Ash Robson, as a junior, Robson played for York Acorn RLFC before signing for Castleford Tigers. He returned to Acorn and played a handful of games before retiring.
