= Siddal A.R.L.F.C. =

English amateur rugby league club, based in Halifax, West Yorkshire

Siddal

Club information
- Full name: Siddal Amateur; Rugby League Football Club
- Colours: Blue, White & Black

Current details
- Ground: Siddal Sports & Community Centre, Exley Lane, Halifax, HX3 9EW
- CEO: Eddie Golding-Smith
- Coach: Jake Connor
- Competition: NCRL National Premier League

Siddal are an amateur rugby league football club from Halifax, West Yorkshire. The club currently competes in the NCRL National Premier League. The club also operates a number of academy teams. The club is notable as being the first competitive opponents of Canadian professional club, Toronto Wolfpack, to whom they narrowly lost 14–6 in a match streamed worldwide on the BBC Sports website.

== Honours ==
- National Conference League Premier Division
  - Winners (4): 2002–03, 2003–04, 2008–09, 2016, 2024
- BARLA National Cup
  - Winners (2): 2008–09, 2022–23
- BARLA Yorkshire Cup
  - Winners (1): 1997–98
