= Royal Navy Rugby League =

British rugby league team representing the Royal Navy

Royal Navy

Club information
- Full name: Royal Navy Rugby League
- Colours: blue and white
- Founded: 1997

Current details
- Ground: United Services Recreation Ground
- Competition: Challenge Cup

The Royal Navy Rugby League team is a British rugby league team representing the Royal Navy. They play their home matches at the United Services Recreation Ground in Portsmouth, Hampshire. They were founded in 1997 following an increase in support of rugby league by members of the Royal Navy.

== History ==
Historically, rugby league had been banned in the British Armed forces since 1895 due to rugby union's Rugby Football Union's ban on anyone who played rugby league from playing rugby union. The ban was temporarily relaxed during the First World War to allow players from both codes to play together. Sailors deployed at HMNB Devonport founded a rugby league team in 1917 and they toured the country during the remainder of the war, making three tours of rugby league's northern heartlands. Most of the players involved never returned to rugby union once the ban was reinstated after the war.

Despite the temporary wartime relaxation, rugby league remained banned in the Royal Navy until 1994. When the ban was lifted, the British Army and Royal Air Force set up their own teams the same year. But the Royal Navy did not set up their own until 1997, which was made in response to a request by members of the Royal Navy who were fans of rugby league. Accordingly, this meant they were able to enter the Challenge Cup, which they did for the first time in the 2000 Challenge Cup after the Rugby Football League decided to allow all of the forces teams to enter. In 2010, they reached the third round of the Cup, the highest round reached by any Forces side until the British Army equaled it in 2020. The Royal Navy did not take part in the 2021 Challenge Cup due to the RFL deciding that only the professional teams would be allowed to compete due to the COVID-19 pandemic in the United Kingdom.

The Royal Navy also take part in the Inter Services Tournament, which had historically been dominated by the Army and the RAF. The Royal Navy won their first title in 2004 and then repeated that success in 2008. They have hosted touring Naval representative sides from the Royal Australian Navy for a Remembrance Day series in 2018, with the Royal Navy whitewashing them 3-0 in a three game series.

In 2017, to celebrate the Royal Navy Rugby League's 20th anniversary, they hosted an Origin match between their East and West Barracks at Leeds Rhinos' Headingley Stadium with the aim of raising money for the Royal Navy and Royal Marines Charity.

=== Challenge Cup ===
Year	2000	2001	2002	2003	2004	2005	2006	2007	2008	2009
Round	R2	R2	R1	R1	R2	R1	R1	R2	R2	R3
Year	2010	2011	2012	2013	2014	2015	2016	2017	2018	2019
Round	R2	R3	R2	R1	R2	R1	R1	R1	R1	R1
Year	2020	2021	2022	2023						
Round	R1	—N/a	R4	R2						

=== Women's Challenge Cup ===
Year	2018	2019	2020	2021	2022
Round	—N/a	—N/a	—N/a	—N/a	—N/a
