= Royal Air Force Rugby League =

British rugby league team representing the Royal Air Force

Royal Air Force

Club information
- Full name: Royal Air Force Rugby League
- Nickname(s): Blue Bombers
- Short name: RAF
- Colours: light blue, dark blue and maroon
- Founded: 1994

Current details
- Ground(s): RAF Cranwell
- Competition: Challenge Cup

The Royal Air Force Rugby League is a British rugby league team representing the Royal Air Force. They were officially set up in 1994 following an unofficial team set up in 1992 to circumvent a British Armed Forces ban on rugby league. They play in the Challenge Cup and they play their home matches at RAF Cranwell in Cranwell, Lincolnshire.

== History ==
Historically, rugby league had been banned in the British Armed Forces due to rugby union's Rugby Football Union's law stating that anyone who played rugby league would be banned from playing rugby union. Northern based Royal Air Force personnel argued for its lifting in the 1980s but it remained in place. Despite this, some RAF personnel set up an unofficial rugby league team called the "Blue Bombers" without RAF authorisation in 1992. When the ban on the sport within the services was lifted in 1994, the RAF Rugby League Association was founded by Squadron Leader Damian Clayton, who would captain the team from its foundation to 2006. The RAF rugby league team was established at the same time as the British Army's rugby league association. They eventually gained official RAF sanction on 1st Jan 1996. The President of the RAF Rugby League, Air commodore Dean Andrew later became the President of the Rugby Football League. In 2020, their kit was supplied by O'Neills which led to some controversy in Ireland due to the kitmaker's history of making Gaelic Athletic Association kits solely.

The RAF play inter-services matches against the British Army and Royal Navy. They won their first title in 2001, ending the British Army's seven season winning streak which had run since the establishment of the Inter-Services Championship. Their 2015 Inter-Services Championship match against the British Army was held at Salford Red Devils' AJ Bell Stadium as part of an awareness campaign. In 2012 and 2016, the RAF won the Inter-Services Rugby League Title. In 2019, an RAF player died during a match against the Army at Aldershot Military Stadium following a head injury.

The RAF set up a women's rugby league team and some of the servicewomen who play for the RAF have been selected for international representative matches.

== Challenge Cup ==
Challenge Cup results
Year	2000	2001	2002	2003	2004	2005	2006	2007	2008	2009
Round	R2	R1	R2	R1	R2	R1	R1	R1	R1	R1
Year	2010	2011	2012	2013	2014	2015	2016	2017	2018	2019
Round	R1	R2	R2	R2	R1	R1	R1	R1	R2	R2
Year	2020	2021	2022	2023	2024	2025				
Round	R1	—	R1	R2	R1	R1				

=== Women's Challenge Cup ===
The women's team took part in the 2019 Women's Challenge Cup in which they reached the second round.
