= 2008–09 National Conference League =

- League: National Conference League
- Teams: 39

2008–09 Season
- Champions: Siddal
- League Leaders: Siddal

The 2008–09 National Conference League was the 24th season of the National Conference League, the top league for British amateur rugby league clubs.

== Premier Division ==
=== League table ===
Pos	Team	Pld	W	D	L	PF	PA	PD	Pts	Promotion, qualification or relegation
1	Siddal (C)	26	19	0	7	639	385	+254	38	Qualification for National Conference League play-offs
2	East Hull	26	17	1	8	640	466	+174	35	Qualification for National Conference League play-offs
3	Skirlaugh	26	17	0	9	696	436	+260	34	Qualification for National Conference League play-offs
4	Leigh Miners Rangers	26	16	1	9	743	548	+195	33	Qualification for National Conference League play-offs
5	York Acorn	26	16	0	10	697	564	+133	32	Qualification for National Conference League play-offs
6	Oulton Raiders	26	14	0	12	665	528	+137	28	Qualification for National Conference League play-offs
7	Hull Dockers	26	14	0	12	645	524	+121	28	
8	Leigh East	26	13	1	12	595	519	+76	27	
9	Wigan St Patricks	26	13	0	13	458	546	−88	26	
10	Wigan St Judes	26	12	1	13	698	603	+95	25	
11	West Hull	26	12	0	14	654	534	+120	24	
12	Thatto Heath Crusaders (R)	26	12	0	14	638	581	+57	24	Relegated to National Conference League Division One
13	Rochdale Mayfield (R)	26	3	0	23	394	1079	−685	6	Relegated to National Conference League Division One
14	Thornhill Trojans (R)	26	2	0	24	382	1231	−849	4	Relegated to National Conference League Division One

Rules for classification: 1) Points; 2) Points difference; 3) Number of points scored;
(C) Champions; (R) Relegated

=== Play-offs ===
Siddal defeated East Hull 15–8 in the playoff Grand Final to become National Conference League champions. The final took place at Post Office Road in Featherstone.

Elimination finals
18 April 2009
3	Skirlaugh	10
6	Oulton Raiders	42
18 April 2009
4	Leigh Miners Rangers	36
5	York Acorn	54

Major/Minor semifinal
25 April 2009
1	Siddal	4
2	East Hull	24
25 April 2009
York Acorn	0
Oulton Raiders	38

Preliminary final
2 May 2009
Siddal	22
Oulton Raiders	18

Grand Final
9 May 2009
Siddal	15
East Hull	8

== Division One ==
=== League table ===
Pos	Team	Pld	W	D	L	PF	PA	PD	Pts	Promotion, qualification or relegation
1	Wath Brow Hornets (C, P)	24	18	2	4	576	324	+252	38	Promoted to National Conference League Premier Division
2	Ince Rose Bridge (P)	24	17	2	5	632	406	+226	36	Promoted to National Conference League Premier Division
3	Widnes St Maries (P)	24	14	2	8	596	461	+135	30	Promoted to National Conference League Premier Division
4	Saddleworth Rangers	24	13	0	11	468	377	+91	26	
5	Stanningley	24	12	1	11	510	426	+84	25	
6	Castleford Panthers	24	12	1	11	490	492	−2	25	
7	Bradford Dudley Hill	24	11	2	11	589	498	+91	24	
8	West Bowling	24	12	0	12	534	496	+38	24	
9	Normanton Knights	24	11	2	11	516	564	−48	24	
10	Millom	24	10	0	14	513	604	−91	20	
11	Eastmoor Dragons (R)	24	8	0	16	449	586	−137	16	Relegated to National Conference League Division Two
12	Oldham St Annes (R)	24	7	1	16	470	671	−201	15	Relegated to National Conference League Division Two
13	Shaw Cross Sharks (R)	24	4	1	19	294	732	−438	9	Relegated to National Conference League Division Two

Rules for classification: 1) Points; 2) Points difference; 3) Number of points scored;
(C) Champions; (P) Promoted; (R) Relegated

== Division Two ==
Myton Warriors were elected into the league this season.

Hull Isberg withdrew from the league at the end of the season.

=== League table ===
Pos	Team	Pld	W	D	L	PF	PA	PD	Pts	Promotion, qualification or relegation
1	Myton Warriors (C, P)	22	18	1	3	694	310	+384	37	Promoted to National Conference League Division One
2	Milford Marlins (P)	22	15	0	7	812	343	+469	30	Promoted to National Conference League Division One
3	Heworth (P)	22	14	1	7	590	457	+133	29	Promoted to National Conference League Division One
4	Ovenden	22	13	1	8	683	394	+289	27	
5	Castleford Lock Lane	22	13	0	9	592	527	+65	26	
6	Eccles & Salford Juniors	22	13	0	9	471	457	+14	26	
7	Stanley Rangers	22	11	1	10	413	534	−121	23	
8	Crosfields	22	9	2	11	485	526	−41	20	
9	Waterhead Warriors	22	8	1	13	453	599	−146	17	
10	Egremont Rangers	22	8	1	13	436	705	−269	17	
11	East Leeds	22	4	0	18	302	557	−255	8	
12	Hull Isberg	22	2	0	20	352	874	−522	4	

Rules for classification: 1) Points; 2) Points difference; 3) Number of points scored;
(C) Champions; (P) Promoted
