= 2013 National Conference League =

- League: National Conference League
- Teams: 50

2013 Season
- Champions: West Hull
- League Leaders: Thatto Heath Crusaders

The 2013 National Conference League was the 28th season of the National Conference League, the top league for British amateur rugby league clubs.

== Premier Division ==
The Premier Division featured three new clubs:

- Egremont Rangers, promoted as champions from 2012 NCL Division One
- Castleford Lock Lane, promoted from 2012 NCL Division One
- York Acorn, promoted from 2012 NCL Division One

=== League table ===
Pos	Team	Pld	W	D	L	PF	PA	PD	Pts	Promotion, qualification or relegation
1	Thatto Heath Crusaders	26	19	0	7	916	557	+359	38	Qualification for National Conference League play-offs
2	Wath Brow Hornets	26	19	0	7	708	350	+358	38	Qualification for National Conference League play-offs
3	Castleford Lock Lane	26	19	0	7	661	476	+185	38	Qualification for National Conference League play-offs
4	West Hull (C)	26	17	0	9	654	408	+246	34	Qualification for National Conference League play-offs
5	Siddal	26	16	1	9	705	510	+195	33	Qualification for National Conference League play-offs
6	Egremont Rangers	26	14	0	12	690	590	+100	28	Qualification for National Conference League play-offs
7	Wigan St Patricks	26	13	1	12	563	534	+29	27	
8	Leigh Miners Rangers	26	12	1	13	549	704	−155	25	
9	Hull Dockers	26	10	1	15	486	728	−242	21	
10	Skirlaugh	26	10	0	16	557	534	+23	20	
11	East Hull	26	9	1	16	499	806	−307	19	
12	York Acorn (R)	26	7	1	18	575	670	−95	15	Relegated to National Conference League Division One
13	Myton Warriors (R)	26	6	2	18	477	726	−249	14	Relegated to National Conference League Division One
14	Ince Rose Bridge (R)	26	7	0	19	523	970	−447	14	Relegated to National Conference League Division One

Rules for classification: 1) Points; 2) Points difference; 3) Number of points scored;
(C) Champions; (R) Relegated

=== Play-offs ===
Elimination finals
26 October 2013
3	Lock Lane	48
6	Egremont Rangers	16
26 October 2013 (Note: Result did not stand as extra time was incorrectly played under the golden point rule. Siddal refused to play in the replay, resulting in a bye for West Hull.)
4	West Hull	14
5	Siddal	15

Major/Minor semifinal
2 November 2013
1	Thatto Heath Crusaders	0
2	Wath Brow Hornets	30
2 November 2013
Lock Lane	6
West Hull	8

Preliminary final
9 November 2013
Thatto Heath Crusaders	12
West Hull	14

Grand Final
17 November 2013
Wath Brow Hornets	12
West Hull	16

== Division One ==
Division One featured five new clubs:

- East Leeds, promoted as champions from 2012 NCL Division Two
- Waterhead Warriors, promoted from 2012 NCL Division Two
- Dewsbury Celtic, promoted from 2012 NCL Division Two
- Oulton Raiders, relegated from 2012 NCL Premier Division
- Saddleworth Rangers, relegated from 2012 NCL Premier Division

=== League table ===
Pos	Team	Pld	W	D	L	PF	PA	PD	Pts	Promotion, qualification or relegation
1	East Leeds (C, P)	24	20	1	3	839	300	+539	41	Promoted to National Conference League Premier Division
2	Hunslet Warriors (P)	24	18	1	5	672	459	+213	37	Promoted to National Conference League Premier Division
3	Wigan St Judes (P)	24	18	1	5	676	586	+90	37	Promoted to National Conference League Premier Division
4	Rochdale Mayfield	24	18	0	6	955	498	+457	36	
5	Oulton Raiders	24	14	1	9	692	495	+197	29	
6	Milford Marlins	24	14	0	10	602	425	+177	28	
7	Bradford Dudley Hill	24	11	0	13	673	622	+51	22	
8	Dewsbury Celtic	24	8	0	16	566	708	−142	16	
9	Eccles & Salford	24	7	1	16	541	768	−227	15	
10	Millom	24	7	0	17	396	737	−341	14	
11	Stanley Rangers (R)	24	6	1	17	480	721	−241	13	Relegated to National Conference League Division Two
12	Saddleworth Rangers (R)	24	6	0	18	387	742	−355	12	Relegated to National Conference League Division Two
13	Waterhead Warriors (R)	24	6	0	18	463	881	−418	12	Relegated to National Conference League Division Two

Rules for classification: 1) Points; 2) Points difference; 3) Number of points scored;
(C) Champions; (P) Promoted; (R) Relegated

== Division Two ==
Division Two featured four new clubs:

- Leigh East, relegated from 2012 NCL Premier Division
- Castleford Panthers, relegated from 2012 NCL Division One
- Oldham St Annes, relegated from 2012 NCL Division One
- Stanningley, relegated from 2012 NCL Division One

Widnes West Bank resigned from the league mid-season; their results were expunged.

=== League table ===
Pos	Team	Pld	W	D	L	PF	PA	PD	Pts	Promotion, qualification or relegation
1	Normanton Knights (C, P)	18	15	1	2	667	292	+375	31	Promoted to National Conference League Division One
2	Shaw Cross Sharks (P)	18	15	0	3	539	306	+233	30	Promoted to National Conference League Division One
3	Askam	18	14	0	4	634	319	+315	28	
4	Elland	18	10	1	7	383	390	−7	21	
5	Leigh East	18	9	1	8	468	536	−68	19	
6	Oldham St Annes	18	8	0	10	486	434	+52	16	
7	Ovenden	18	6	0	12	467	378	+89	12	
8	Stanningley	18	4	1	13	368	654	−286	9	
9	Castleford Panthers	18	4	1	13	278	630	−352	9	
10	Eastmoor Dragons (R)	18	2	1	15	332	683	−351	5	Relegated to National Conference League Division Three

Rules for classification: 1) Points; 2) Points difference; 3) Number of points scored;
(C) Champions; (P) Promoted; (R) Relegated

== Division Three ==
Division Three featured ten new clubs:

- Crosfields, relegated from 2012 NCL Division Two
- Featherstone Lions, relegated from 2012 NCL Division Two
- Heworth, relegated from 2012 NCL Division Two
- Seven new teams were also granted membership to the National Conference League: Blackbrook, Hindley, Kells, Peterlee Pumas, Pilkington Recs, Wigan St Cuthberts and Woolston Rovers.

=== League table ===
Pos	Team	Pld	W	D	L	PF	PA	PD	Pts	
1	Kells (C, P)	22	20	0	2	990	199	+791	40	Promoted to National Conference League Division Two
2	Pilkington Recs (P)	22	20	0	2	867	338	+529	40	Promoted to National Conference League Division Two
3	Underbank Rangers	22	18	0	4	824	266	+558	36	
4	Blackbrook	22	15	0	7	662	333	+329	30	
5	Woolston Rovers	22	13	0	9	764	434	+330	26	
6	Coventry Bears	22	10	1	11	602	527	+75	21	
7	Crosfields	22	9	1	12	556	643	−87	19	
8	Hindley	22	9	0	13	597	638	−41	18	
9	Featherstone Lions	22	8	0	14	421	933	−512	16	
10	Heworth	22	5	0	17	418	740	−322	10	
11	Wigan St Cuthberts	22	4	0	18	421	727	−306	8	
12	Peterlee Pumas	22	0	0	22	130	1474	−1344	0	

Rules for classification: 1) Points; 2) Points difference; 3) Number of points scored;
(C) Champions; (P) Promoted
