= 2010–11 National Conference League =

- League: National Conference League
- Teams: 38

2010–11 Season
- Champions: Thatto Heath Crusaders
- League Leaders: Siddal

The 2010–11 National Conference League was the 26th season of the National Conference League, the top league for British amateur rugby league clubs, and was the final season that the league was played in the winter.

== Premier Division ==
The Premier Division featured three new clubs:

- Thatto Heath Crusaders, promoted as champions from RLC Division One
- Bradford Dudley Hill and Saddleworth Rangers, promoted from RLC Division One

=== League table ===
Pos	Team	Pld	W	D	L	PF	PA	PD	Pts	Promotion, qualification or relegation
1	Siddal	26	19	0	7	708	481	+227	38	Qualification for National Conference League play-offs
2	Thatto Heath Crusaders (C)	26	19	0	7	746	527	+219	38	Qualification for National Conference League play-offs
3	Leigh East	26	16	0	10	766	487	+279	32	Qualification for National Conference League play-offs
4	Wath Brow Hornets	26	15	2	9	671	554	+117	32	Qualification for National Conference League play-offs
5	Hull Dockers	26	16	0	10	610	562	+48	32	Qualification for National Conference League play-offs
6	West Hull	26	15	1	10	660	548	+112	31	Qualification for National Conference League play-offs
7	Leigh Miners Rangers	26	15	0	11	719	584	+135	30	
8	Skirlaugh	26	12	2	12	572	536	+36	26	
9	Saddleworth Rangers	26	11	1	14	570	710	−140	23	
10	East Hull	26	9	2	15	533	602	−69	20	
11	Wigan St Patricks	26	9	1	16	505	620	−115	19	
12	Bradford Dudley Hill (R)	26	9	0	17	592	702	−110	18	Relegated to National Conference League Division One
13	Wigan St Judes (R)	26	7	0	19	470	875	−405	14	Relegated to National Conference League Division One
14	York Acorn (R)	26	5	1	20	471	805	−334	11	Relegated to National Conference League Division One

Rules for classification: 1) Points; 2) Points difference; 3) Number of points scored;
(C) Champions; (R) Relegated

=== Play-offs ===
Elimination finals
7 May 2011
3	Leigh East	40
6	West Hull	28
7 May 2011
4	Wath Brow Hornets	30
5	Hull Dockers	6

Major/Minor semifinal
14 May 2011
1	Siddal	40
2	Thatto Heath Crusaders	8
14 May 2011
Leigh East	16
Wath Brow Hornets	0

Preliminary final
21 May 2011
Thatto Heath Crusaders	24
Leigh East	19

Grand Final
29 May 2011
Siddal	18
Thatto Heath Crusaders	30

== Division One ==
Division One featured six new clubs:

- Eccles & Salford, promoted as champions from RLC Division Two
- Oldham St Annes and Stanley Rangers, promoted from RLC Division Two
- Ince Rose Bridge, Oulton Raiders and Widnes St Maries, relegated from RLC Premier Division

Widnes St Maries resigned from the league mid-season; their record was expunged.

=== League table ===
Pos	Team	Pld	W	D	L	PF	PA	PD	Pts	Promotion, qualification or relegation
1	Oulton Raiders (C, P)	22	19	2	1	805	334	+471	40	Promoted to National Conference League Premier Division
2	Myton Warriors (P)	22	16	1	5	651	442	+209	33	Promoted to National Conference League Premier Division
3	Ince Rose Bridge (P)	22	14	1	7	624	367	+257	29	Promoted to National Conference League Premier Division
4	Rochdale Mayfield	22	14	0	8	589	480	+109	28	
5	Stanley Rangers	22	12	0	10	480	460	+20	24	
6	Milford Marlins	22	10	0	12	458	496	−38	20	
7	Oldham St Annes	22	9	0	13	547	611	−64	18	
8	Millom	22	9	0	13	390	713	−323	18	
9	Stanningley	22	8	0	14	383	489	−106	16	
10	Castleford Panthers	22	8	0	14	426	532	−106	16	
11	Eccles & Salford	22	8	0	14	497	605	−108	16	
12	Normanton Knights (R)	22	3	0	19	384	705	−321	6	Relegated to National Conference League Division Two

Rules for classification: 1) Points; 2) Points difference; 3) Number of points scored;
(C) Champions; (P) Promoted; (R) Relegated

== Division Two ==
Division Two featured four new clubs:

- Heworth and West Bowling, relegated from RLC Division One
- Hunslet Warriors and Elland, elected into league

West Bowling were forced to withdraw at the end of the season due to the league being switched to a summer competition and their pitch not being available during the cricket season.

=== League table ===
Pos	Team	Pld	W	D	L	PF	PA	PD	Pts	Promotion, qualification or relegation
1	Hunslet Warriors (C, P)	22	20	1	1	856	256	+600	41	Promoted to National Conference League Division One
2	Egremont Rangers (P)	22	18	0	4	810	406	+404	36	Promoted to National Conference League Division One
3	Castleford Lock Lane (P)	22	15	0	7	580	336	+244	30	Promoted to National Conference League Division One
4	Eastmoor Dragons	22	14	1	7	524	396	+128	29	
5	Ovenden	22	10	2	10	510	432	+78	22	
6	Elland	22	9	1	12	406	449	−43	19	
7	East Leeds	22	9	1	12	446	548	−102	19	
8	West Bowling	22	9	0	13	425	473	−48	18	
9	Shaw Cross Sharks	22	7	1	14	362	547	−185	15	
10	Crosfields (Note: Although there was no official relegation to Division Three, Crosfields, Featherstone Lions and Heworth were all demoted due to non-fulfillment of a fixture during the season.)	22	7	0	15	408	711	−303	14	
11	Waterhead Warriors	22	7	0	15	377	702	−325	14	
12	Heworth	22	3	1	18	270	718	−448	7	

Rules for classification: 1) Points; 2) Points difference; 3) Number of points scored;
(C) Champions; (P) Promoted

== 2011 transitional season ==
Between August 2011 and November 2011, a short transitional season was played in preparation for the switch to a summer competition in 2012. Two new teams, Askam and Widnes West Bank, joined the competition, increasing the number of teams to 40. The league was split into eight groups of five teams based in geographical location (due to the subsequent withdrawal of West Bowling, Group G only consisted of four teams). The play-offs were contested by the eight group winners. The league champions were Hunslet Warriors, who defeated Wigan St Patricks 18–14 in the play-off final after extra time.

=== Group A ===
Pos	Team	Pld	W	D	L	PF	PA	PD	Pts	Promotion, qualification or relegation
1	Leigh East (Q)	12	8	0	4	302	266	+36	16	Qualification for National Conference League play-offs
2	Wath Brow Hornets	12	7	0	5	288	177	+111	14	
3	Egremont Rangers	12	6	1	5	261	226	+35	13	
4	Leigh Miners Rangers	12	6	1	5	260	236	+24	13	
5	Thatto Heath Crusaders	12	6	0	6	328	286	+42	12	

Rules for classification: 1) Points; 2) Points difference; 3) Number of points scored;
(Q) Qualified for the phase indicated

=== Group B ===
Pos	Team	Pld	W	D	L	PF	PA	PD	Pts	Promotion, qualification or relegation
1	Wigan St Patricks (Q)	12	11	0	1	404	152	+252	22	Qualification for National Conference League play-offs
2	Ince Rose Bridge	12	6	0	6	300	326	−26	12	
3	Millom	12	4	0	8	182	260	−78	8	
4	Wigan St Judes	12	3	0	9	232	320	−88	6	
5	Askam	12	2	0	10	116	404	−288	4	

Rules for classification: 1) Points; 2) Points difference; 3) Number of points scored;
(Q) Qualified for the phase indicated

=== Group C ===
Pos	Team	Pld	W	D	L	PF	PA	PD	Pts	Promotion, qualification or relegation
1	Siddal (Q)	12	11	0	1	541	136	+405	22	Qualification for National Conference League play-offs
2	Ovenden	12	4	0	8	242	266	−24	8	
3	Rochdale Mayfield	12	4	0	8	259	318	−59	8	
4	Saddleworth Rangers	12	4	0	8	228	388	−160	8	
5	Elland	12	4	0	8	186	393	−207	8	

Rules for classification: 1) Points; 2) Points difference; 3) Number of points scored;
(Q) Qualified for the phase indicated

=== Group D ===
Pos	Team	Pld	W	D	L	PF	PA	PD	Pts	Promotion, qualification or relegation
1	Hunslet Warriors (C, Q)	12	8	1	3	363	192	+171	17	Qualification for National Conference League play-offs
2	East Leeds	12	8	1	3	261	185	+76	17	
3	Milford Marlins	12	8	1	3	257	190	+67	17	
4	Oulton Raiders	12	4	0	8	230	303	−73	8	
5	Stanningley	12	3	1	8	194	398	−204	7	

Rules for classification: 1) Points; 2) Points difference; 3) Number of points scored;
(C) Champions; (Q) Qualified for the phase indicated

=== Group E ===
Pos	Team	Pld	W	D	L	PF	PA	PD	Pts	Promotion, qualification or relegation
1	Widnes West Bank (Q)	12	12	0	0	381	191	+190	24	Qualification for National Conference League play-offs
2	Waterhead Warriors	12	9	0	3	396	202	+194	18	
3	Oldham St Annes	12	7	1	4	380	252	+128	15	
4	Eccles & Salford	12	4	0	8	298	372	−74	8	
5	Crosfields	12	2	0	10	198	457	−259	4	

Rules for classification: 1) Points; 2) Points difference; 3) Number of points scored;
(Q) Qualified for the phase indicated

=== Group F ===
Pos	Team	Pld	W	D	L	PF	PA	PD	Pts	Promotion, qualification or relegation
1	Castleford Lock Lane (Q)	12	9	1	2	386	202	+184	19	Qualification for National Conference League play-offs
2	Eastmoor Dragons	12	7	0	5	312	342	−30	14	
3	Stanley Rangers	12	3	1	8	341	334	+7	7	
4	Normanton Knights	12	3	1	8	228	446	−218	7	
5	Castleford Panthers	12	1	2	9	253	375	−122	4	

Rules for classification: 1) Points; 2) Points difference; 3) Number of points scored;
(Q) Qualified for the phase indicated

=== Group G ===
Pos	Team	Pld	W	D	L	PF	PA	PD	Pts	Promotion, qualification or relegation
1	Bradford Dudley Hill (Q)	10	7	0	3	372	232	+140	14	Qualification for National Conference League play-offs
2	York Acorn	10	6	0	4	290	187	+103	12	
3	Shaw Cross Sharks	10	3	0	7	176	385	−209	6	
4	Heworth	10	0	0	10	131	452	−321	0	

Rules for classification: 1) Points; 2) Points difference; 3) Number of points scored;
(Q) Qualified for the phase indicated

=== Group H ===
Pos	Team	Pld	W	D	L	PF	PA	PD	Pts	Promotion, qualification or relegation
1	Skirlaugh (Q)	12	11	0	1	428	159	+269	22	Qualification for National Conference League play-offs
2	Myton Warriors	10	7	0	3	279	190	+89	14	
3	East Hull	12	6	0	6	298	272	+26	12	
4	West Hull	10	4	0	6	236	283	−47	8	
5	Hull Dockers	12	4	0	8	312	362	−50	8	

Rules for classification: 1) Points; 2) Points difference; 3) Number of points scored;
(Q) Qualified for the phase indicated

=== Play-offs ===
Quarterfinals
Castleford Lock Lane	4
Hunslet Warriors	22
Bradford Dudley Hill	26
Skirlaugh	14
Siddal	30
Widnes West Bank	12
Leigh East	22
Wigan St Patricks	44

Semifinals
Hunslet Warriors	24
Bradford Dudley Hill	18
Siddal	22
Wigan St Patricks	23

Finals
Hunslet Warriors	18
Wigan St Patricks	14
