= 2012 National Conference League =

- League: National Conference League
- Teams: 51

2012 Season
- Champions: Wath Brow Hornets
- League Leaders: Wath Brow Hornets

The 2012 National Conference League was the 27th season of the National Conference League, the top league for British amateur rugby league clubs, and was the first season that the league was played in the summer.

The league was expanded to four tiers for the first time, with the new Division Three largely consisting of teams from the former Rugby League Conference National Division.

== Premier Division ==
The Premier Division featured three new clubs:

- Oulton Raiders, promoted as champions from 2010–11 NCL Division One
- Ince Rose Bridge, promoted from 2010–11 NCL Division One
- Myton Warriors, promoted from 2010–11 NCL Division One

=== League table ===
Pos	Team	Pld	W	D	L	PF	PA	PD	Pts	Promotion, qualification or relegation
1	Wath Brow Hornets (C)	26	17	2	7	655	563	+92	36	Qualification for National Conference League play-offs
2	Siddal	26	18	0	8	630	594	+36	36	Qualification for National Conference League play-offs
3	Myton Warriors	26	16	3	7	665	429	+236	35	Qualification for National Conference League play-offs
4	Thatto Heath Crusaders	26	17	0	9	790	556	+234	34	Qualification for National Conference League play-offs
5	Leigh Miners Rangers	26	16	1	9	750	477	+273	33	Qualification for National Conference League play-offs
6	West Hull	26	16	0	10	590	487	+103	32	Qualification for National Conference League play-offs
7	Wigan St Patricks	26	14	0	12	647	541	+106	28	
8	Hull Dockers	26	13	0	13	628	637	−9	26	
9	Ince Rose Bridge	26	9	2	15	581	607	−26	20	
10	East Hull	26	9	2	15	633	721	−88	20	
11	Skirlaugh	26	9	1	16	439	636	−197	19	
12	Leigh East (R)	26	9	0	17	604	662	−58	18	Relegated to National Conference League Division Two (Note: Leigh East were already relegated based on their league position, but were demoted another division due to non-fulfillment of a fixture during the season.)
13	Oulton Raiders (R)	26	7	1	18	500	765	−265	15	Relegated to National Conference League Division One
14	Saddleworth Rangers (R)	26	5	2	19	505	942	−437	12	Relegated to National Conference League Division One

Rules for classification: 1) Points; 2) Points difference; 3) Number of points scored;
(C) Champions; (R) Relegated

=== Play-offs ===
Elimination finals
27 October 2012
3	Myton Warriors	24
6	West Hull	22
27 October 2012
4	Thatto Heath Crusaders	38
5	Leigh Miners Rangers	6

Major/Minor semifinal
3 November 2012
1	Wath Brow Hornets	18
2	Siddal	12
3 November 2012
Myton Warriors	21
Thatto Heath Crusaders	20

Preliminary final
10 November 2012
Siddal	22
Myton Warriors	23

Grand Final
16 November 2012
Wath Brow Hornets	22
Myton Warriors	6

== Division One ==
Division One featured six new clubs:

- Hunslet Warriors, promoted as champions from 2010–11 NCL Division Two
- Castleford Lock Lane, promoted from 2010–11 NCL Division Two
- Egremont Rangers, promoted from 2010–11 NCL Division Two
- Bradford Dudley Hill, relegated from 2010–11 NCL Premier Division
- Wigan St Judes, relegated from 2010–11 NCL Premier Division
- York Acorn, relegated from 2010–11 NCL Premier Division

=== League table ===
Pos	Team	Pld	W	D	L	PF	PA	PD	Pts	Promotion, qualification or relegation
1	Egremont Rangers (C, P)	26	19	0	7	921	558	+363	38	Promoted to National Conference League Premier Division
2	Castleford Lock Lane (P)	26	19	0	7	679	443	+236	38	Promoted to National Conference League Premier Division
3	York Acorn (P)	26	19	0	7	701	509	+192	38	Promoted to National Conference League Premier Division
4	Bradford Dudley Hill	26	18	1	7	850	404	+446	37	
5	Hunslet Warriors	26	18	1	7	746	434	+312	37	
6	Rochdale Mayfield	26	15	1	10	759	587	+172	31	
7	Milford Marlins	26	14	2	10	692	438	+254	30	
8	Wigan St Judes	26	15	0	11	796	662	+134	30	
9	Eccles & Salford	26	12	1	13	669	718	−49	25	
10	Millom	26	10	0	16	536	661	−125	20	
11	Stanley Rangers	26	8	1	17	534	832	−298	17	
12	Stanningley (R)	26	8	0	18	426	822	−396	16	Relegated to National Conference League Division Two
13	Oldham St Annes (R)	26	2	0	24	414	872	−458	4	Relegated to National Conference League Division Two
14	Castleford Panthers (R)	26	1	1	24	282	1065	−783	3	Relegated to National Conference League Division Two

Rules for classification: 1) Points; 2) Points difference; 3) Number of points scored;
(C) Champions; (P) Promoted; (R) Relegated

== Division Two ==
Division Two featured five new clubs:

- Normanton Knights, relegated from 2010–11 NCL Division One
- Askam, played in 2011 NCL transitional season
- Widnes West Bank, played in 2011 NCL transitional season
- Dewsbury Celtic, joined from Rugby League Conference National Division
- Featherstone Lions, joined from Rugby League Conference National Division

=== League table ===
Pos	Team	Pld	W	D	L	PF	PA	PD	Pts	Promotion, qualification or relegation
1	East Leeds (C, P)	24	22	0	2	800	313	+487	44	Promoted to National Conference League Division One
2	Waterhead Warriors (P)	24	18	0	6	799	454	+345	36	Promoted to National Conference League Division One
3	Dewsbury Celtic (P)	24	17	1	6	832	463	+369	35	Promoted to National Conference League Division One
4	Shaw Cross Sharks	24	17	1	6	568	382	+186	35	
5	Widnes West Bank	24	13	1	10	657	488	+169	27	
6	Crosfields (R)	24	11	0	13	562	594	−32	22	Relegated to National Conference League Division Three (Note: Although there was no official relegation to Division Three, Crosfields, Featherstone Lions and Heworth were all demoted due to non-fulfillment of a fixture during the season.)
7	Normanton Knights	24	11	0	13	499	762	−263	22	
8	Ovenden	24	10	1	13	544	651	−107	21	
9	Featherstone Lions (R)	24	9	3	12	565	724	−159	21	Relegated to National Conference League Division Three
10	Askam	24	10	0	14	511	615	−104	20	
11	Elland	24	9	1	14	569	518	+51	19	
12	Eastmoor Dragons	24	4	1	19	524	706	−182	9	
13	Heworth (R)	24	0	1	23	252	1012	−760	1	Relegated to National Conference League Division Three

Rules for classification: 1) Points; 2) Points difference; 3) Number of points scored;
(C) Champions; (P) Promoted; (R) Relegated

== Division Three ==
Of the ten clubs in the newly formed Division Three, seven joined from the former Rugby League Conference National Division and two teams were promoted from the RLC Premier Divisions (Bristol Sonics and St Albans Centurions). The tenth club, South Wales Hornets, were a newly founded team. The Grand Final winners were Hemel Stags, defeating Underbank Rangers 17–10.

At the end of the season, all clubs apart from Underbank Rangers and Coventry Bears withdrew from the league for various reasons:

- Hemel Stags, accepted into Championship One
- Bristol Sonics, St Albans Centurions and Nottingham Outlaws, joined newly formed Conference League South
- Bramley Buffaloes and Kippax Knights, applications rejected by NCL; joined Yorkshire Men's League
- Warrington Wizards, merged with Woolston Rovers
- South Wales Hornets, folded

=== League table ===
Pos	Team	Pld	W	D	L	PF	PA	PD	Pts	
1	Underbank Rangers	18	16	0	2	702	160	+542	50	Qualification for NCL Division Three play-offs
2	Hemel Stags (C)	18	15	0	3	612	229	+383	47	Qualification for NCL Division Three play-offs
3	Coventry Bears	18	13	0	5	512	320	+192	40	Qualification for NCL Division Three play-offs
4	Warrington Wizards	18	12	0	6	543	402	+141	37	Qualification for NCL Division Three play-offs
5	Bramley Buffaloes	18	8	0	10	378	402	−24	29	Qualification for NCL Division Three play-offs
6	Nottingham Outlaws	18	6	0	12	366	620	−254	21	Qualification for NCL Division Three play-offs
7	St Albans Centurions	18	5	0	13	362	626	−264	20	
8	Kippax Knights	17	5	0	12	302	454	−152	19	
9	Bristol Sonics	17	5	0	12	333	583	−250	18	
10	South Wales Hornets	18	4	0	14	297	611	−314	14	

Rules for classification: 1) Points; 2) Points difference; 3) Number of points scored;
(C) Champions

=== Play-offs ===
Elimination finals
9 September 2012
3	Coventry Bears	40
6	Nottingham Outlaws	16
8 September 2012
4	Warrington Wizards	64
5	Bramley Buffaloes	22

Major/Minor semifinal
15 September 2012
1	Underbank Rangers	14
2	Hemel Stags	24
15 September 2012
Coventry Bears	44
Warrington Wizards	34

Preliminary final
22 September 2012
Underbank Rangers	36
Coventry Bears	18

Grand Final
29 September 2012
Hemel Stags	17
Underbank Rangers	10
