= Zack McComb =

Ireland international rugby league player

Personal information
- Full name: Zack McComb
- Born: 9 September 1995 (age 30) Keighley, West Yorkshire, England
- Height: 180 cm (5 ft 11 in)
- Weight: 90 kg (198 lb; 14 st 2 lb)

Playing information
- Position: Centre, Wing
Club
Years	Team	Pld	T	G	FG	P
2002–2009	Siddal Juniors
2010–15	Huddersfield Giants Academy
2016	Batley Bulldogs	0	0	0	0	0
2016 (DR)	→Oxford	2	0	0	0	0
2016 (loan)	→ Gloucestershire All Golds	4	1	0	0	4
2016–17	Siddal ARLFC
2018–19	Oldham RLFC	42	27	0	0	108
2020	Sheffield Eagles	7	1	0	0	4
2021–	Halifax Panthers	68	19	0	0	76
2021 (loan)	→ Dewsbury Rams	2	0	0	0	0
	Total	125	48	0	0	192
Representative
Years	Team	Pld	T	G	FG	P
2017	England Universities
2019–25	Ireland	3	1	0	0	4
- Source: Rugby League Project Its Rugby As of 4 September 2026

Zack McComb (born 9 September 1995) is an English born Irish rugby league player, who currently plays for Halifax Panthers in the RFL Championship.

== Club career ==
=== 2002-2016 ===
He began his club career at Siddal joining at 7, he was approached by Salford Red Devils, Bradford Bulls and Huddersfield Giants. He ended up joining Huddersfield playing for 5 years before joining Batley Bulldogs for 8 months, at his time at Batley he was loaned out to Gloucestershire All Golds as well as being dual registered with Oxford.

=== 2016-2017 ===
He returned to Siddal in the National Conference Leagues playing for 2 years, including starting in their Challenge Cup match against the Toronto Wolfpack. At Siddal he won the 2016 NCL Premier Division, topping the table again in the 2017 NCL Premier Division falling short to Thatto Heath Crusaders in the final. In 2017 he was also playing BUCS rugby league for Leeds Beckett University.

=== 2017-2020 ===
He joined Oldham playing for two years helping them gain promotion from League One. Scoring 27 tries in 42 appearances. He left to join Sheffield Eagles however only made 7 appearances due to the season being cut short due to the COVID-19 pandemic.

=== 2021- ===
He left enough of an impression in his few appearances and was picked up by Halifax Panthers in 2021, signing him on an initial two-year contract being extended to the end of the 2023 season. In 2023 he won the RFL 1895 Cup starting in the final against Batley Bulldogs. His impressive performances led to him receiving the 2023 Star Man Award and getting his contracted extended to the end of the 2024 season.

While at Halifax he spent time on loan at Dewsbury Rams in the RFL League One featuring twice.

== International career ==
=== England Universities ===
In 2017 he was selected to be a part of the England Universities squad for the 2017 Student World Cup in Australia. England making it to the semifinals before being knocked by the hosts and eventual winners Australia.

=== Ireland ===
He started at centre in a 25–4 win over Italy in the RLWC European Qualifiers A 2019.

He scored a try in the win over Scotland in October 2024 in Gateshead.

== Honors ==
=== England Universities ===
- 2017 Student World Cup (runners up)

=== Oldham RLFC ===
- 2019 RFL League 1 (runners up)

=== Siddal ARLFC ===
- 2016 NCL Premier Division (champions)
- 2017 NCL Premier Division (runners up)

=== Halifax Panthers ===
- 1895 Cup (champions)

=== Personal ===
- Halifax Panthers Star Man Award 2023
