= Nathan Magee =

English rugby league footballer

Personal information
- Full name: Nathan Magee
- Born: 5 June 2003 (age 21)

Playing information
- Position: Second-row
Club
Years	Team	Pld	T	G	FG	P
2021	Castleford Tigers	1	0	0	0	0
- Source: As of 11 July 2021

Nathan Magee is an English former professional rugby league footballer who most recently played as a second-row forward for the Castleford Tigers in the Super League.

== Background ==
Magee played junior rugby league for West Hull ARLFC.

== Career ==
On 11 July 2021, Magee made his Super League début for the Castleford Tigers against the Salford Red Devils.

Magee departed Castleford after the 2021 season, and has since played for amateur side Skirlaugh in the NCL Division One.
