= 2019 National Conference League =

- League: National Conference League
- Teams: 50

2019 Season
- Champions: West Hull
- League Leaders: Wath Brow Hornets

The 2019 National Conference League was the 34th season of the National Conference League, the top league for British amateur rugby league clubs.

The Premier Division champions were West Hull, who defeated Thatto Heath Crusaders 18–14 in the Grand Final after golden point extra time.

== Premier Division ==
POS	CLUB	P	W	L	D	PF	PA	DIFF	PTS
1	Wath Brow Hornets	22	16	4	2	597	275	322	34
2	West Hull (C)	22	16	5	1	511	287	224	33
3	Hunslet Club Parkside	22	16	6	0	412	262	150	32
4	Thatto Heath Crusaders	22	15	6	1	585	329	256	31
5	Underbank Rangers	22	13	9	0	545	430	115	26
6	Siddal	22	13	9	0	525	445	80	26
7	Egremont Rangers	22	11	11	0	462	401	61	22
8	Lock Lane	22	9	13	0	414	567	-153	18
9	Rochdale Mayfield	22	7	14	1	440	563	-123	15
10	Leigh Miners Rangers	22	6	15	1	351	660	-309	13
11	Thornhill Trojans	22	4	18	0	355	616	-261	8
12	Kells	22	3	19	0	240	602	-362	6

=== Playoffs ===
Eliminatiors

- Hunslet Club Parkside 10-11 Siddal
- Thatto Heath Crusaders 32-6 Underbank Rangers

Semi-finals

- West Brow Hornets 10-24 West Hull
- Thatto Heath Crusaders 34-4 Siddal

Preliminary Final

- West Brow Hornets 12-18 Thatto Heath Crusaders

Grand Final

- Thatto Heath Crusaders 14-18 West Hull

== Division One ==
POS	CLUB	P	W	L	D	PF	PA	DIFF	PTS
1	Pilkington Recs (P)	22	18	4	0	621	320	301	36
2	York Acorn (P)	22	16	5	1	706	371	335	33
3	Featherstone Lions (P)	22	16	5	1	682	355	327	33
4	Milford	22	13	8	1	467	89	78	27
5	Stanningley	22	11	10	1	499	427	72	23
6	Wigan St Patricks	22	11	10	1	501	490	11	23
7	Myton Warriors	22	9	11	2	517	496	21	20
8	Oulton Raiders	22	9	13	0	447	560	-113	18
9	Skirlaugh	22	9	13	0	391	667	-276	18
10	Saddleworth Rangers	22	8	13	1	534	595	-61	17
11	Normanton Knights	22	5	17	0	390	705	-315	10
12	Dewsbury Moor Maroons	22	3	19	0	380	760	-380	6

=== Playoffs ===
Semi-finals

- Featherstone Lions 30–2 Wigan St Patricks
- Milford 14–17 Stanningley

Final

- Featherstone Lions 23–10 Stanningley

== Division Two ==
POS	CLUB	P	W	L	D	PF	PA	DIFF	PTS
1	West Bowling (P)	22	18	4	0	891	411	480	36
2	Ince Rose Bridge (P)	22	16	6	0	637	449	188	32
3	Wigan St Judes	22	15	6	1	717	534	183	31
4	Hull Dockers (P)	22	12	9	1	670	507	163	25
5	Barrow Island	22	12	9	1	579	483	96	25
6	Crosfields	22	12	10	0	602	485	117	24
7	Bradford Dudley Hill	22	13	8	1	534	449	85	23
8	Clock Face Miners	22	8	13	1	558	533	2	17
9	Beverley	22	8	13	1	500	570	-70	17
10	East Leeds	22	6	15	1	479	733	-254	13
11	Shaw Cross Sharks	22	5	16	1	372	805	-433	7
12	Askam	22	3	19	0	291	871	-580	6

Table Deductions

- Shaw Cross Sharks: 2 points for playing An Unregistered Player
- Shaw Cross Sharks: 2 points for playing An Unregistered Player
- Bradford Dudley Hill: 4 points for playing A Banned Player

=== Playoffs ===
Semi-finals

- Wigan St Judes 42–46 Crosfields
- Hull Dockers 56–18 Barrow Island

Final

- Crosfields 16–44 Hull Dockers

== Division Three ==
Three new teams were elected into the National Conference League this season (Heworth, Batley Boys and Hensingham), with Division Three expanding to 14 teams.

Salford City Roosters withdrew from the league during the middle of the season.

POS	CLUB	P	W	L	D	PF	PA	DIFF	PTS
1	Woolston Rovers (P)	26	20	4	2	799	382	417	42
2	Hunslet Warriors (P)	26	20	5	1	744	426	318	41
3	Heworth	26	18	8	0	803	474	329	36
4	Dewsbury Celtic (P)	26	17	7	2	651	435	216	36
5	Batley Boys	26	16	8	2	636	478	158	34
6	Drighlington	26	15	10	1	607	432	175	31
7	Leigh East	26	14	11	1	613	551	62	29
8	Waterhead Warriors	26	14	12	0	647	605	42	28
9	Oldham St Annes	26	11	13	2	558	615	-57	24
10	Hensingham	26	8	17	1	598	767	-169	17
11	Millom	26	7	17	2	484	699	-215	16
12	Gateshead Storm	26	6	19	1	513	887	-374	13
13	Eastmoor Dragons	26	5	21	0	450	822	-372	10
14	Salford City Roosters	26	3	22	1	398	928	-530	7

=== Playoffs ===
Semi-finals

- Heworth 68–16 Drighlington
- Dewsbury Celtic 36–4 Batley Boys

Final

- Heworth 16–30 Dewsbury Celtic
