= 2018 National Conference League =

- League: National Conference League
- Teams: 48

2018 Season
- Champions: Hunslet Club Parkside
- League Leaders: Hunslet Club Parkside

The 2018 National Conference League was the 33rd season of the National Conference League, the top league for British amateur rugby league clubs.

The following are the results for each season:

== Premier Division ==
POS	CLUB	P	W	L	D	PF	PA	DIFF	PTS
1	Hunslet Club Parkside (C)	22	22	0	0	617	192	425	44
2	West Hull	22	15	7	0	519	297	222	30
3	Thatto Heath Crusaders	22	15	7	0	547	396	151	30
4	Egremont Rangers	22	14	8	0	524	413	111	28
5	Wath Brow Hornets	22	12	10	0	461	321	140	24
6	Underbank Rangers	22	12	9	1	536	512	24	23
7	Siddal	22	10	12	0	442	435	7	20
8	Rochdale Mayfield	22	8	14	0	446	500	-54	16
9	Kells	22	7	13	2	321	457	-136	16
10	Normanton Knights	22	8	14	0	392	569	-177	16
11	Wigan St Patricks	22	4	18	0	358	648	-290	8
12	Myton Warriors	22	3	18	1	385	808	-423	7

Table Deductions

- Underbank Rangers: 2 points for playing an unregistered player

=== Playoffs ===
Eliminatiors

- Egermont Rangers 28-12 Wath Brow Hornets
- Thatto Heath Crusaders 14-24 Underbank Rangers

Semi-finals

- Egermont Rangers 22-18 Underbank Rangers
- Hunslet Club Parkside 9-2 West Hull

Preliminary Final

- West Hull 16-8 Egermont Rangers

Grand Final

- Hunslet Club Parkside 26-18 West Hull

== Division One ==
POS	CLUB	P	W	L	D	PF	PA	DIFF	PTS
1	Thornhill Trojans	22	16	4	2	677	352	325	34
2	Lock Lane	22	15	6	1	679	429	250	31
3	Leigh Miners Rangers	22	15	7	0	581	490	91	30
4	Pilkington Recs	22	14	7	1	587	447	140	29
5	Milford Marlins	22	12	8	2	475	479	-4	26
6	Featherstone Lions	22	12	10	0	567	462	105	24
7	York Acorn	22	11	10	1	552	544	8	23
8	Skirlaugh	22	10	11	1	608	488	120	21
9	Oulton Raiders	22	9	12	1	508	538	-30	19
10	Ince Rose Bridge	22	6	15	1	376	659	-283	13
11	Shaw Cross Sharks	22	4	18	0	336	764	-428	8
12	Bradford Dudley Hill	22	3	19	0	364	658	-294	6

== Division Two ==
POS	CLUB	P	W	L	D	PF	PA	DIFF	PTS
1	Stanningley	22	17	5	0	663	414	249	34
2	Dewsbury Moor Maroons	22	16	5	1	648	386	262	33
3	Crosfields	22	15	7	0	672	460	212	30
4	Askam	22	13	9	0	573	538	35	26
5	Wigan St Judes	22	12	10	0	650	500	150	24
6	Saddleworth Rangers	22	10	12	0	599	485	114	20
7	East Leeds	22	12	10	0	588	553	35	20
8	West Bowling	22	10	12	0	490	672	-182	20
9	Hull Dockers	22	9	12	1	571	648	-77	19
10	Drighlington	22	7	15	0	424	607	-183	14
11	Hunslet Warriors	22	7	15	0	408	657	-249	14
12	Leigh East	22	3	19	0	356	722	-366	6

Table Deductions

East Leeds: 4 points for not Playing a play off game

== Division Three ==
Beverley returned to the league for the first time since 1999.

Blackbrook were readmitted into Division Three following their withdrawal from Division One the previous year, but the club exited the NCL altogether early in the season, and the one fixture they had played was expunged. Stanley Rangers withdrew from the league during the middle of the season.

POS	CLUB	P	W	L	D	PF	PA	DIFF	PTS
1	Beverley	22	19	1	2	902	326	576	40
2	Barrow Island	22	17	5	0	810	356	454	32
3	Millom	22	13	8	1	740	362	378	27
4	Clock Face Miners	22	12	7	3	633	466	167	27
5	Woolston Rovers	22	13	8	1	547	446	101	27
6	Eastmoor Dragons	22	11	9	2	601	540	61	24
7	Dewsbury Celtic	22	12	10	0	569	361	208	22
8	Oldham St Annes	22	10	11	1	660	562	98	21
9	Gateshead Storm	22	8	14	0	518	612	-94	16
10	Waterhead Warriors	22	7	15	0	434	698	-264	14
11	Salford City Roosters	22	4	18	0	301	972	-671	8
12	Stanley Rangers	22	1	21	0	211	1225	-1014	2

Table Deductions

- Barrow Island: 2 points for playing an unregistered Player
- Dewsbury Celtic: 2 points for playing an Unregistered Player
