= Salford City =

Salford City may refer to:

- The City of Salford
- Salford City F.C., an association football club from the city
- Salford Red Devils, a professional rugby league club from the city formerly known as the Salford City Reds
- Salford City Roosters, an amateur rugby league club from the city
