= 2015 National Conference League =

- League: National Conference League
- Teams: 49

2015 Season
- Champions: Leigh Miners Rangers
- League Leaders: Leigh Miners Rangers

The 2015 National Conference League was the 30th season of the National Conference League, the top league for British amateur rugby league clubs.

The following are the results for each season:

== Premier Division ==
POS	CLUB	P	W	L	D	PF	PA	DIFF	PTS
1	Leigh Miners Rangers (C)	22	16	6	0	636	494	142	32
2	Siddal	22	15	7	0	668	394	274	30
3	Rochdale Mayfield	22	15	7	0	720	548	172	30
4	Wigan St Patricks	22	11	9	2	568	589	-21	24
5	Wath Brow Hornets	22	11	10	1	572	453	119	23
6	Hull Dockers	22	10	10	2	556	604	-48	22
7	Lock Lane	22	8	11	3	560	550	10	19
8	West Hull	22	9	12	1	472	507	-35	19
9	Egremont Rangers	22	9	12	1	528	653	-125	19
10	East Leeds	22	9	12	1	474	624	-150	19
11	Thatto Heath Crusaders	22	8	13	1	478	596	-118	17
12	Oulton Raiders	22	5	17	0	468	688	-220	10

=== Playoffs ===
Eliminatiors

- Wigan St Patricks 18-34 Wath Brow Hornets
- Rochdale Mayfield 54-4 Hull Dockers

Semi-finals

- Rochdale Mayfield 22-12 Wath Brow Hornets
- Leigh Miners Rangers 14-34 Siddal

Preliminary Final

- Leigh Miners Rangers 30-24 Rochdale Mayfield

Grand Final

- Leigh Miners Rangers 22-20 Siddal

== Division One ==
POS	CLUB	P	W	L	D	PF	PA	DIFF	PTS
1	Kells	26	21	4	1	736	531	205	43
2	Pilkington Recs	26	20	5	1	925	465	460	41
3	Normanton Knights	26	18	7	1	715	538	177	37
4	Shaw Cross Sharks	26	15	10	1	726	524	202	31
5	York Acorn	26	14	10	2	814	633	181	30
6	Ince Rose Bridge	26	15	11	0	693	632	61	30
7	Hunslet Warriors	26	15	11	0	605	662	-57	30
8	Myton Warriors	26	14	11	1	700	567	133	29
9	Skirlaugh	26	12	12	2	719	714	5	26
10	Milford Marlins	26	11	14	1	594	644	-50	23
11		26	10	16	0	598	641	-43	20
12	Salford City Roosters	26	7	19	0	530	864	-334	14
13	Wigan St Judes	26	3	23	0	502	901	-399	6
14	Saddleworth Rangers	26	2	24	0	424	965	-541	4

== Division Two ==
POS	CLUB	P	W	L	D	PF	PA	DIFF	PTS
1	Millom	18	16	2	0	565	278	287	32
2	Featherstone Lions	18	15	3	0	683	366	317	30
3	Leigh East	18	12	5	1	468	365	103	25
4	Blackbrook	18	9	8	1	486	379	107	19
5	Underbank Rangers	18	9	8	1	431	350	81	19
6	Dewsbury Celtic	18	8	9	1	370	474	-104	17
7	Bradford Dudley Hill	18	8	10	0	469	322	147	16
8	Askam	18	6	12	0	322	495	-173	12
9	Stanley Rangers	18	4	14	0	274	603	-329	8
10	Oldham St Annes	18	1	17	0	290	726	-436	2
11	Castleford Panthers	0	0	0	0	0	0	0	0

== Division Three ==
Heworth withdrew from the league early in the season.

POS	CLUB	P	W	L	D	PF	PA	DIFF	PTS
1	Hunslet Club Parkside	20	19	1	0	919	236	683	38
2	Thornhill Trojans	20	16	4	0	769	281	488	32
3	Drighlington	20	14	6	0	664	322	342	28
4	Stanningley	20	13	6	1	571	326	245	27
5	Woolston Rovers	20	13	6	1	605	381	224	27
6	Dewsbury Moor Maroons	20	9	11	0	494	529	-35	18
7	Crosfields	20	8	10	2	471	529	-58	18
8	Waterhead Warriors	20	5	15	0	382	773	-391	10
9	Gateshead Storm	20	5	15	0	329	784	-455	10
10		20	4	16	0	390	840	-450	8
11	Eastmoor Dragons	20	2	18	0	226	819	-593	4
12	Heworth	0	0	0	0	0	0	0	0
