= Beverley A.R.L.F.C. =

English amateur rugby league club

Club information
- Full name: Beverley; Amateur Rugby League Football Club
- Nickname(s): Blue & Golds
- Colours: Blue and gold
- Founded: 1883; 143 years ago
- Website: Club Website

Current details
- Ground: Beverley Leisure Centre
- Competition: National Conference League

Beverley A.R.L.F.C. is an English amateur rugby league club based in Beverley, East Riding of Yorkshire. Their first team competes in the National Conference League.

== History ==
The club was founded in 1883. The club's most notable achievement in its early years was their 7–2 victory against professional side Ebbw Vale in the 1909 Challenge Cup.

The club eventually folded in the 1920s but was reformed in 1980. The club competed in the Humberside League before being accepted into the National Conference League (then called the BARLA National League) in 1990. In 1995, they defeated Highfield 27–4 in the Challenge Cup, becoming the first amateur club to knock out a professional side in the competition since their previous victory in 1909. In 1996, Beverley were promoted to the National Conference League Premier Division, spending two seasons in the league before merging with East Hull in 1998.

A third club named Beverley formed in the 1999–2000 season run by Phil Horsfield, competing in the Hull & District League until 2015 when they joined the Yorkshire Men's League. The club re-joined the National Conference League in 2018.

== Honours ==
- National Conference League Division One
  - Winners (1): 1995–96
- National Conference League Division Three
  - Winners (1): 2018
