= Brett Waller =

English rugby league footballer

Personal information
- Full name: Brett Waller
- Born: 3 July 1987 (age 38)

Playing information
- Height: 1.93 m (6 ft 4 in)
- Weight: 126 kg (19 st 12 lb)
- Position: Prop
Club
Years	Team	Pld	T	G	FG	P
2010–11	York City Knights	27	9	0	0	36
2012	Gateshead Thunder	21	12	0	0	48
2013–15	Doncaster	42	9	0	0	36
2016	York City Knights	21	3	0	0	12
2017	Newcastle Thunder	14	2	0	0	8
	Total	125	35	0	0	140

Brett Waller is an English former rugby league footballer who last played for the Newcastle Thunder in League 1. His position is prop.

He has previously played for Gateshead Thunder, Doncaster, York City Knights, and with amateur club Skirlaugh. He re-signed to Newcastle Thunder from York in November 2016 having previously played for the Gateshead Thunder until 2012.
