= 2017 National Conference League =

- League: National Conference League
- Teams: 47

2017 Season
- Champions: Thatto Heath Crusaders
- League Leaders: Siddal

The 2017 National Conference League was the 32nd season of the National Conference League, the top league for British amateur rugby league clubs.

The following are the results for each season:

== Premier Division ==
POS	CLUB	P	W	L	D	PF	PA	DIFF	PTS
1	Siddal	22	19	2	1	768	301	467	39
2	Thatto Heath Crusaders (C)	22	18	4	0	710	386	324	36
3	Wath Brow Hornets	22	15	6	1	477	408	69	31
4	Rochdale Mayfield	22	14	6	2	633	405	228	30
5	West Hull	22	13	9	0	490	389	101	26
6	Kells	22	10	12	0	438	466	-28	20
7	Egremont Rangers	22	9	13	0	486	537	-51	18
8	Myton Warriors	22	9	13	0	479	599	-120	18
9	Wigan St Patricks	22	7	14	1	439	648	-209	15
10	Skirlaugh	22	6	16	0	354	560	-206	12
11	Pilkington Recs	22	6	16	0	456	675	-219	12
12	Leigh Miners Rangers	22	3	18	1	378	734	-356	7

=== Playoffs ===
Eliminatiors

- Wath Brow Hornets 20-16 Kells
- Rochdale Mayfield 28-6 West Hull

Semi-finals

- Siddal 36-22 Thatto Heath Crusaders
- Wath Brow Hornets 24-18 Rochdale Mayfield

Preliminary Final

- Thatto Heath Crusaders 28-12 Wath Brow Hornets

Grand Final

- Thatto Heath Crusaders 18-12 Siddal

== Division One ==
Blackbrook's results were expunged following their withdrawal from the league.

POS	CLUB	P	W	L	D	PF	PA	DIFF	PTS
1	Hunslet Club Parkside	20	19	1	0	603	238	365	38
2	Underbank Rangers	20	17	3	0	625	345	280	34
3	Normanton Knights	20	12	8	0	585	456	129	24
4	Milford Marlins	20	11	8	1	426	447	-21	23
5	York Acorn	20	10	10	0	516	446	70	20
6	Lock Lane	20	9	10	1	531	447	84	19
7	Featherstone Lions	20	7	13	0	489	587	-98	14
8	Shaw Cross Sharks	20	7	13	0	407	529	-122	14
9	Ince Rose Bridge	20	7	13	0	438	566	-28	14
10	Hunslet Warriors	20	5	15	0	328	595	-267	10
11	Hull Dockers	20	5	15	0	317	609	-292	10

== Division Two ==
POS	CLUB	P	W	L	D	PF	PA	DIFF	PTS
1	Oulton Raiders	22	17	4	1	835	376	59	35
2	Thornhill Trojans	22	17	5	0	667	408	259	34
3	Wigan St Judes	22	15	6	1	585	510	75	31
4	Bradford Dudley Hill	22	15	6	1	592	420	172	29
5	East Leeds	22	13	9	0	634	469	165	26
6	Askam	22	12	10	0	662	541	121	24
7	Crosfields	22	11	9	2	587	514	73	24
8	Saddleworth Rangers	22	9	13	0	531	576	-45	18
9	Drighlington	22	7	15	0	493	512	-19	14
10	Leigh East	22	7	15	0	439	561	-122	14
11	Millom	22	5	16	1	347	685	-338	11
12	Salford City Roosters	22	1	21	0	265	1065	-800	2

Table Deductions

- Bradford Dudley Hill: 2 points for playing ineligible player

== Division Three ==
Three new teams entered the league in the 2017 season; Barrow Island, Clock Face Miners and West Bowling.

Elland and Rylands Sharks withdrew from the league during the middle of the season, and their results for the season were expunged.

POS	CLUB	P	W	L	D	PF	PA	DIFF	PTS
1	West Bowling	22	18	4	0	917	489	428	36
2	Stanningley	22	17	5	0	660	411	249	34
3	Dewsbury Moor Maroons	22	16	6	0	701	424	277	32
4	Eastmoor Dragons	22	16	6	0	692	524	168	32
5	Woolston Rovers	22	14	8	0	697	463	234	28
6	Oldham St Annes	22	11	11	0	618	504	114	22
7	Gateshead Storm	22	11	11	0	618	653	-35	22
8	Clock Face Miners	22	9	12	1	450	517	-67	19
9	Barrow Island	22	8	13	1	510	580	-70	17
10	Dewsbury Celtic	22	3	17	2	351	671	-320	8
11	Stanley Rangers	22	4	18	0	330	940	-610	8
12	Waterhead Warriors	22	3	19	0	452	820	-368	2

Table Deductions

- Waterhead Warriors: 4 points for playing banned player
