= 2014 National Conference League =

- League: National Conference League
- Teams: 49

2014 Season
- Champions: West Hull
- League Leaders: West Hull

The 2014 National Conference League was the 29th season of the National Conference League, the top league for British amateur rugby league clubs.

The following are the results for each season:

== Premier Division ==
POS	CLUB	P	W	L	D	PF	PA	DIFF	PTS
1	West Hull (C)	24	18	5	1	641	364	277	37
2	Wath Brow Hornets	24	16	7	1	651	351	300	33
3	Siddal	24	16	8	0	648	444	204	32
4	Lock Lane	24	14	8	2	649	480	169	30
5	Thatto Heath Crusaders	24	15	9	0	585	506	79	30
6	Leigh Miners Rangers	24	14	9	1	587	478	109	29
7	East Leeds	24	12	10	2	638	528	110	26
8	Egremont Rangers	24	13	11	0	593	598	-5	26
9	Wigan St Patricks	24	10	14	0	613	614	-1	20
10	Hull Dockers	24	8	14	2	459	624	-165	18
11	Skirlaugh	24	7	16	1	492	622	-130	15
12	Hunslet Warriors	24	6	18	0	392	658	-266	12
13	Wigan St Judes	24	2	22	0	284	965	-681	4
14		0	0	0	0	0	0	0	0

=== Playoffs ===
Eliminatiors

- Siddal 30-28 Leigh Miners Rangers
- Lock Lane 21-10 Leigh Miners Rangers

Semi-finals

- Siddal 20-16 Lock Lane
- West Hull 5-22 Wath Brow Hornets

Preliminary Final

- West Hull 10-6 Siddal

Grand Final

- Wath Brow Hornets 8-20 West Hull

== Division One ==
POS	CLUB	P	W	L	D	PF	PA	DIFF	PTS
1	Oulton Raiders	22	21	1	0	782	298	484	42
2	Rochdale Mayfield	22	20	1	1	840	407	433	41
3	Myton Warriors	22	14	8	0	662	502	160	28
4	Shaw Cross Sharks	22	11	10	1	569	505	64	23
5	Normanton Knights	22	11	10	1	559	547	12	23
6	Ince Rose Bridge	22	11	11	0	450	587	-137	22
7	York Acorn	22	9	11	2	506	536	-30	20
8	Saddleworth Rangers	22	8	13	1	536	662	-126	17
9	Milford Marlins	22	6	15	1	489	614	-125	13
10	Salford City Roosters	22	6	15	1	458	665	-207	13
11	Dewsbury Celtic	22	6	15	1	387	603	-216	13
12	Millom	22	4	17	1	372	684	-312	9

== Division Two ==
POS	CLUB	P	W	L	D	PF	PA	DIFF	PTS
1	Kells	22	19	2	1	943	332	611	39
2		22	16	6	0	707	313	394	32
3	Pilkington Recs	22	15	6	1	928	373	555	31
4	Bradford Dudley Hill	22	14	7	1	635	440	195	29
5		22	10	10	2	591	546	45	22
6	Leigh East	22	10	11	1	600	566	34	21
7	Oldham St Annes	22	10	11	1	513	592	-79	21
8	Stanley Rangers	22	9	13	0	475	663	-188	18
9	Askam	22	8	13	1	555	642	-87	17
10	Castleford Panthers	22	7	14	1	408	824	-416	15
11	Waterhead Warriors	22	5	16	1	357	876	-519	11
12	Stanningley	22	4	18	0	348	893	-545	8

== Division Three ==
POS	CLUB	P	W	L	D	PF	PA	DIFF	PTS
1	Featherstone Lions	18	17	0	1	808	216	592	35
2	Blackbrook	18	14	3	1	663	236	427	29
3	Underbank Rangers	18	13	4	1	719	237	482	27
4	Crosfields	18	10	7	1	557	422	135	21
5	Coventry Bears	18	8	9	1	544	440	104	17
6	Hindley	18	8	10	0	457	566	-109	16
7	Heworth	18	6	11	1	378	508	-130	13
8	Woolston Rovers	18	5	13	0	326	577	-251	10
9	Eastmoor Dragons	18	5	13	0	300	592	-292	10
10	Peterlee Pumas	18	1	17	0	146	1104	-958	2
11	Wigan St Cuthberts	0	0	0	0	0	0	0	0
