= 2025 National Conference League =

- League: National Conference League
- Duration: 8 March − 4 October
- Teams: 46

2025 Season
- Champions: West Hull
- League Leaders: Siddal

The 2025 National Conference League was the 40th season of the National Conference League, the top league for British amateur rugby league clubs.

It was the final season before the restructure of amateur rugby league in the United Kingdom, which saw the National Conference League replaced by the National Community Rugby League.

Fixtures were released on 12 December 2024. The following are the results for each season:

== Premier Division ==
POS	CLUB	P	W	L	D	PF	PA	DIFF	PTS
1	Siddal	22	18	3	1	658	246	412	37
2	West Bowling	22	16	6	0	676	428	248	32
3	West Hull	22	16	6	0	542	334	208	32
4	Waterhead Warriors	22	14	8	0	638	398	240	28
5	Thatto Heath Crusaders	22	13	9	0	566	444	122	26
6	Rochdale Mayfield	22	12	10	0	583	496	87	24
7	Hunslet ARLFC	22	11	10	1	472	438	34	23
8	Wath Brow Hornets	22	9	12	1	382	522	-140	19
9	York Acorn	22	9	13	0	310	499	-189	18
10	Lock Lane	22	6	13	3	372	531	-159	15
11	Dewsbury Moor Maroons	22	3	18	1	337	606	-269	7
12	Leigh Miners Rangers	22	1	20	1	216	810	-594	3

=== Playoffs ===
The playoff final was streamed on YouTube.

Eliminators Round 2

- West Hull 36−12 Rochdale Mayfield
- Waterhead Warriors 21−26 Thatto Heath Crusaders

Semi-finals

- Siddal 26−0 West Bowling
- West Hull 16−8 Thatto Heath Crusaders

Preliminary Final

- West Bowling 16−20 West Hull

Final

- Siddal 0−8 West Hull

== Division One ==
POS	CLUB	P	W	L	D	PF	PA	DIFF	PTS
1	Wigan St Judes	22	18	3	1	677	334	343	37
2	Heworth	22	18	4	0	646	289	357	36
3	Ince Rose Bridge	22	17	4	1	646	340	306	35
4	Stanningley	22	14	8	0	537	357	180	28
5	Oldham St Annes	22	11	10	1	567	520	47	23
6	Shaw Cross Sharks	22	11	11	0	484	405	79	22
7	Kells	22	10	12	0	443	393	50	20
8	Wigan St Patricks	22	9	12	1	482	436	46	19
9	Egremont Rangers	22	9	13	0	426	552	-126	18
10	Oulton Raiders	22	5	17	0	319	650	-331	10
11	Crosfields	22	4	18	0	336	754	-418	8
12	Woolston Rovers	22	4	18	0	312	845	-533	8

== Division Two ==
POS	CLUB	P	W	L	D	PF	PA	DIFF	PTS
1	East Leeds	22	22	0	0	1092	224	868	44
2	Dewsbury Celtic	22	18	4	0	670	174	496	36
3	Pilkington Recs	22	15	6	1	594	386	208	31
4	Clock Face Miners	22	13	7	2	544	473	71	28
5	Hensingham	22	13	9	0	577	422	155	26
6	Normanton Knights	22	10	11	1	536	551	-15	21
7	Drighlington	22	9	13	0	401	642	-241	18
8	Barrow Island	21	8	12	1	438	455	-17	17
9	Skirlaugh	22	8	14	0	412	616	-204	16
10	Thornhill Trojans	22	5	17	0	342	686	-344	10
11	Hull Dockers	22	4	18	0	356	904	-548	8
12	Ellenborough	21	3	17	1	264	693	-429	7

== Division Three ==
POS	CLUB	P	W	L	D	PF	PA	DIFF	PTS
1	Keighley Albion	18	13	5	0	448	339	109	26
2	Saddleworth Rangers	18	12	6	0	463	264	199	24
3	Bentley	18	12	6	0	396	287	109	24
4	Myton Warriors	18	11	7	0	414	327	87	22
5	Leigh East	18	9	9	0	426	366	60	18
6	Featherstone Lions	18	9	9	0	362	361	1	18
7	Distington	18	9	9	0	265	456	-191	18
8	Millom	18	6	11	1	334	478	-144	13
9	Milford	18	5	13	0	336	458	-122	10
10	Beverley	18	3	14	1	368	476	-108	7
