= 2024 National Conference League =

- League: National Conference League
- Duration: 22 March − 4 October
- Teams: 46

2024 Season
- Champions: Hunslet
- League Leaders: Siddal

The 2024 National Conference League was the 39th season of the National Conference League, the top league for British amateur rugby league clubs.

Fixtures were released on 14 December 2023. The following are the results for each season:

In 2024, dual registration was trialed for the first time in competition.

== Premier Division ==
POS	CLUB	P	W	L	D	PF	PA	DIFF	PTS
1	Siddal	22	18	4	0	698	180	518	36
2	West Hull	22	16	5	1	597	276	321	33
3	Rochdale Mayfield	22	15	5	2	584	364	220	32
4	Hunslet ARLFC (C)	22	14	6	2	565	364	201	30
5	Wath Brow Hornets	22	13	9	0	467	368	99	26
6	York Acorn	22	10	12	0	420	493	-73	20
7	Lock Lane	22	9	13	0	408	566	-158	18
8	Thatto Heath Crusaders	22	8	13	1	510	599	-89	17
9	West Bowling	22	8	14	0	472	598	-126	16
10	Heworth	22	7	15	0	344	504	-160	14
11	Kells	22	5	15	2	299	576	-277	12
12	Egremont Rangers	22	5	17	0	272	748	-476	10

=== Playoffs ===
Eliminatiors Round 2

- Hunslet 24−12 Wath Brow Hornets
- Rochdale Mayfield 56−6 York Acorn

Semi-finals

- Rochdale Mayfield 10−23 Hunslet
- Siddal 22−8 West Hull

Preliminary Final

- West Hull 6−18 Hunslet

Final

- Siddal 12−24 Hunslet

== Division One ==
POS	CLUB	P	W	L	D	PF	PA	DIFF	PTS
1	Waterhead Warriors	22	19	3	0	841	270	571	38
2	Leigh Miners Rangers	22	16	6	0	662	386	276	32
3	Ince Rose Bridge	22	15	7	0	634	420	214	26
4	Dewsbury Moor Maroons	22	15	7	0	566	355	211	26
5	Oulton Raiders	22	11	9	2	516	431	85	24
6	Crosfields	22	11	10	1	518	495	23	23
7	Wigan St Patricks	22	12	10	0	512	509	3	20
8	Woolston Rovers	22	9	13	0	523	579	-56	18
9	Stanningley	22	6	15	1	391	524	-133	13
10	Hull Dockers	22	6	15	1	415	712	-297	13
11	Clock Face Miners	22	6	15	1	321	710	-389	13
12	Skirlaugh	22	3	19	0	319	827	-508	6

== Division Two ==
POS	CLUB	P	W	L	D	PF	PA	DIFF	PTS
1	Wigan St Judes	22	20	2	0	830	346	484	40
2	Shaw Cross Sharks	22	20	2	0	784	316	468	40
3	Dewsbury Celtic	22	13	8	1	503	348	155	27
4	Oldham St Annes	22	13	9	0	550	318	232	26
5	Normanton Knights	22	11	10	1	503	514	-11	23
6	Thornhill Trojans	22	9	13	0	384	506	-122	18
7	Pilkington Recs	22	9	13	0	486	694	-208	18
8	Ellenborough	22	8	13	1	482	573	-91	17
9	Barrow Island	22	8	14	0	425	552	-127	16
10	Millom	22	8	14	0	408	556	-148	16
11	Saddleworth Rangers	22	6	16	0	382	627	-245	12
12	Myton Warriors	22	5	16	1	462	849	-387	11

== Division Three ==
POS	CLUB	P	W	L	D	PF	PA	DIFF	PTS
1	East Leeds	18	16	2	0	648	221	427	28
2	Hensingham	18	13	4	1	472	304	168	27
3	Distington	18	12	4	2	356	257	99	26
4	Drighlington	18	11	7	0	527	362	165	22
5	Beverley	18	11	7	0	468	402	66	18
6	Leigh East	18	8	10	0	564	405	159	16
7	Milford	18	7	9	2	317	358	-41	16
8	Bentley	18	6	11	1	324	460	-136	13
9	Seaton Rangers	18	1	17	0	168	598	-430	2
10	Featherstone Lions	18	2	16	0	270	747	-477	-2
