= 2022 National Conference League =

- League: National Conference League
- Duration: 5 March − 8 October
- Teams: 48

2022 Season
- Champions: Hunslet Club Parkside
- League Leaders: West Hull

The 2022 National Conference League was the 37th season of the National Conference League, the top league for British amateur rugby league clubs.

The following are the results for each season:

== Premier Division ==
Following the withdrawal of Underbank Rangers prior to the start of the season, Thornhill Trojans were elevated to the Premier Division in their place.

| POS | CLUB | P | W | L | D | PF | PA | DIFF | PTS |
| 1 | West Hull | 23 | 20 | 2 | 1 | 711 | 265 | 446 | 41 |
| 2 | Hunslet Club Parkside (C) | 23 | 16 | 6 | 1 | 528 | 280 | 248 | 33 |
| 3 | Thatto Heath Crusaders | 24 | 15 | 8 | 1 | 639 | 448 | 191 | 31 |
| 4 | Lock Lane | 23 | 15 | 8 | 0 | 712 | 450 | 262 | 30 |
| 5 | Siddal | 24 | 15 | 9 | 0 | 590 | 352 | 238 | 30 |
| 6 | Wath Brow Hornets | 23 | 13 | 8 | 2 | 494 | 351 | 43 | 28 |
| 7 | Leigh Miners Rangers | 22 | 9 | 13 | 0 | 438 | 571 | -133 | 18 |
| 8 | York Acorn | 22 | 7 | 14 | 1 | 404 | 552 | -148 | 15 |
| 9 | Rochdale Mayfield | 22 | 7 | 15 | 0 | 448 | 584 | -136 | 14 |
| 10 | Pilkington Recs | 22 | 7 | 15 | 0 | 365 | 527 | -162 | 14 |
| 11 | Thornhill Trojans | 22 | 5 | 17 | 0 | 269 | 796 | -527 | 10 |
| 12 | Egremont Rangers | 22 | 4 | 18 | 0 | 342 | 764 | -422 | 8 |

=== Playoffs ===
Eliminatiors

- Lock Lane 4−36 Siddal
- Thatto Heath Crusaders 28−12 Wath Brow Hornets

Semi-finals

- West Hull 14−2 Hunslet Club Parkside
- Thatto Heath Crusaders 8−22 Siddal

Preliminary Final

- Hunslet Club Parkside 18−14 Siddal

Grand Final

- West Hull 14−18 Hunslet Club Parkside

== Division One ==
| POS | CLUB | P | W | L | D | PF | PA | DIFF | PTS |
| 1 | Kells | 22 | 17 | 5 | 0 | 721 | 350 | 371 | 34 |
| 2 | Wigan St Patricks | 24 | 17 | 7 | 0 | 658 | 401 | 257 | 34 |
| 3 | Hull Dockers | 22 | 17 | 5 | 0 | 592 | 337 | 255 | 34 |
| 4 | Ince Rose Bridge | 23 | 15 | 7 | 1 | 694 | 512 | 182 | 31 |
| 5 | West Bowling | 23 | 14 | 8 | 1 | 608 | 401 | 207 | 29 |
| 6 | Skirlaugh | 24 | 12 | 10 | 2 | 541 | 512 | 29 | 26 |
| 7 | Stanningley | 22 | 11 | 10 | 1 | 515 | 387 | 128 | 23 |
| 8 | Oulton Raiders | 22 | 11 | 10 | 1 | 432 | 453 | -21 | 23 |
| 9 | Featherstone Lions | 22 | 9 | 13 | 0 | 436 | 670 | -234 | 18 |
| 10 | Saddleworth Rangers | 22 | 4 | 18 | 0 | 373 | 687 | -314 | 8 |
| 11 | Myton Warriors | 22 | 4 | 18 | 0 | 364 | 764 | -400 | 8 |
| 12 | Milford | 22 | 1 | 21 | 0 | 303 | 763 | -460 | 2 |

== Division Two ==
| POS | CLUB | P | W | L | D | PF | PA | DIFF | PTS |
| 1 | Heworth | 22 | 19 | 2 | 1 | 745 | 276 | 469 | 39 |
| 2 | Crosfields | 22 | 16 | 6 | 0 | 624 | 500 | 124 | 32 |
| 3 | Clock Face Miners | 24 | 14 | 7 | 3 | 688 | 399 | 289 | 31 |
| 4 | Barrow Island | 23 | 15 | 8 | 0 | 610 | 554 | 56 | 30 |
| 5 | Normanton Knights | 23 | 14 | 8 | 1 | 631 | 510 | 21 | 29 |
| 6 | Woolston Rovers | 24 | 12 | 10 | 2 | 578 | 555 | 23 | 26 |
| 7 | Dewsbury Celtic | 22 | 10 | 12 | 0 | 504 | 453 | 51 | 20 |
| 8 | Dewsbury Moor Maroons | 22 | 8 | 12 | 2 | 436 | 625 | -189 | 18 |
| 9 | Wigan St Judes | 22 | 7 | 14 | 1 | 403 | 567 | -164 | 15 |
| 10 | Beverley | 22 | 6 | 16 | 0 | 336 | 616 | -280 | 12 |
| 11 | Hunslet Warriors | 22 | 4 | 16 | 2 | 394 | 559 | -165 | 10 |
| 12 | Bradford Dudley Hill | 22 | 4 | 18 | 0 | 317 | 652 | -335 | 8 |

== Division Three ==
Two new teams were accepted into the National Conference League – Seaton Rangers and Bentley. The division reverted to a 12-team format.

| POS | CLUB | P | W | L | D | PF | PA | DIFF | PTS |
| 1 | East Leeds | 22 | 19 | 3 | 0 | 942 | 303 | 639 | 38 |
| 2 | Waterhead Warriors | 22 | 18 | 4 | 0 | 875 | 309 | 566 | 36 |
| 3 | Oldham St Annes | 24 | 16 | 8 | 0 | 712 | 436 | 276 | 32 |
| 4 | Seaton Rangers | 23 | 15 | 8 | 0 | 599 | 470 | 129 | 30 |
| 5 | Shaw Cross Sharks | 24 | 15 | 9 | 0 | 579 | 480 | 99 | 30 |
| 6 | Bentley | 23 | 10 | 11 | 2 | 458 | 544 | -86 | 22 |
| 7 | Leigh East | 22 | 10 | 11 | 1 | 475 | 531 | -56 | 21 |
| 8 | Millom | 22 | 9 | 13 | 0 | 474 | 742 | -268 | 18 |
| 9 | Drighlington | 22 | 7 | 15 | 0 | 507 | 773 | -266 | 14 |
| 10 | Batley Boys | 22 | 6 | 16 | 0 | 341 | 507 | -166 | 12 |
| 11 | Hensingham | 22 | 6 | 16 | 0 | 396 | 713 | -317 | 12 |
| 12 | Eastmoor Dragons | 22 | 2 | 19 | 1 | 297 | 847 | -550 | 5 |
