= 2020 National Conference League =

Rugby league season

- League: National Conference League
- Teams: 49

2020 Season
- Champions: N/A
- League Leaders: N/A

The 2020 National Conference League was the 35th season of the National Conference League, the top league for British amateur rugby league clubs.

Due to the COVID-19 pandemic the tournament was initially postponed on 13 March until 6 June, after matchweek two. On 27 April it was announced that the tournament would be cancelled and promotion and relegation scrapped for the 2020 season. A small number of friendlies occurred over the summer, when government restrictions were loosened, in order to help participating clubs with revenue.

== Premier Division ==
Table at time of tournament cancellation:

POS	CLUB	P	W	L	D	PF	PA	DIFF	PTS
1	Siddal	2	2	0	0	56	12	44	4
2	Hunslet Club Parkside	2	2	0	0	36	12	24	4
3	Thatto Heath Crusaders	2	1	0	1	66	52	14	3
4	Wath Brow Hornets	2	1	1	0	30	20	10	2
5	Rochdale Mayfield	2	1	1	0	36	32	4	2
6	Lock Lane	2	1	1	0	35	34	1	2
7	Pilkington Recs	2	1	1	0	26	32	-6	2
8	Underbank Rangers	2	1	1	0	40	54	-14	2
9	York Acorn	2	0	1	1	54	58	-4	1
10	Featherstone Lions	2	0	1	1	48	62	-14	1
11	West Hull	2	0	1	1	28	62	-34	1
12	Egremont Rangers	2	0	2	0	30	55	-25	0

== Division One ==
Table at time of tournament cancellation:

POS	CLUB	P	W	L	D	PF	PA	DIFF	PTS
1	Thornhill Trojans	2	2	0	0	45	20	25	4
2	Wigan St Patricks	2	2	0	0	48	24	24	4
3	Skirlaugh	2	2	0	0	35	14	21	4
4	Kells	2	1	1	0	34	22	12	2
5	Ince Rose Bridge	2	1	1	0	16	19	-3	2
6	Myton Warriors	2	1	1	0	36	44	-8	2
7	Stanningley	2	1	1	0	36	46	-10	2
8	West Bowling	2	1	1	0	36	46	-10	2
9	Hull Dockers	2	1	1	0	42	54	-12	2
10	Milford	2	0	2	0	38	41	-3	0
11	Oulton Raiders	2	0	2	0	28	36	-8	0
12	Leigh Miners Rangers	2	0	2	0	20	48	-28	0

== Division Two ==
Table at time of tournament cancellation:

POS	CLUB	P	W	L	D	PF	PA	DIFF	PTS
1	Dewsbury Celtic	2	2	0	0	68	24	44	4
2	Normanton Knights	2	2	0	0	58	42	16	4
3	Bradford Dudley Hill	2	1	1	0	50	36	14	2
4	Hunslet Warriors - Open Age	2	1	1	0	48	36	12	2
5	Beverley	2	1	1	0	36	30	6	2
6	Clock Face Miners	2	1	1	0	34	28	6	2
7	Wigan St Judes	1	1	0	0	18	14	4	2
8	Barrow Island	2	1	1	0	28	48	-20	2
9	Crosfields	2	1	1	0	20	48	-28	2
10	Dewsbury Moor Maroons	2	0	2	0	30	46	-16	0
11	Woolston Rovers	2	0	2	0	30	48	-18	0
12	Saddleworth Rangers	1	0	1	0	10	30	-20	0

== Division Three ==
Table at time of tournament cancellation:

POS	CLUB	P	W	L	D	PF	PA	DIFF	PTS
1	Leigh East	4	3	1	0	90	72	18	6
2	Eastmoor Dragons	4	2	1	1	80	68	12	5
3	Batley Boys	2	2	0	0	68	6	62	4
4	Drighlington	2	2	0	0	46	28	18	4
5	Heworth	2	1	0	1	56	18	38	3
6	East Leeds	2	1	0	1	42	24	18	3
7	Oldham St Annes	3	1	1	1	48	38	10	3
8	Millom	2	1	0	1	42	38	4	3
9	Shaw Cross Sharks	2	1	1	0	33	50	-17	2
10	Hensingham	3	0	2	1	50	58	-8	1
11	Gateshead Storm	2	0	2	0	16	32	-16	0
12	Waterhead Warriors	2	0	2	0	34	53	-19	0
13	Askam	4	0	4	0	46	166	-120	0
