= 2023 National Conference League =

- League: National Conference League
- Duration: 25 March − 7 October
- Teams: 46 (1 withdrew mid season)

2023 Season
- Champions: Hunslet
- League Leaders: Hunslet

The 2023 National Conference League was the 38th season of the National Conference League, the top league for British amateur rugby league clubs.

Fixtures were released on 16 December 2022. The following are the results for each season:

== Premier Division ==
POS	CLUB	P	W	L	D	PF	PA	DIFF	PTS
1	Hunslet ARLFC (C)	22	19	3	0	695	228	467	38
2	West Hull	22	18	4	0	707	334	373	36
3	Rochdale Mayfield	22	16	6	0	740	392	348	32
4	Wath Brow Hornets	22	15	6	1	621	304	317	31
5	Siddal	22	10	11	1	476	414	62	21
6	Thatto Heath Crusaders	22	10	12	0	446	589	-143	20
7	York Acorn	22	9	12	1	502	485	17	19
8	Lock Lane	22	9	12	1	468	503	-35	19
9	Kells	22	9	13	0	398	470	-72	18
10	Leigh Miners Rangers	22	6	16	0	374	626	-252	12
11	Wigan St Patricks	22	5	17	0	356	812	-456	10
12	Hull Dockers	22	4	18	0	298	924	-626	8

=== Playoffs ===
Eliminatiors Round 2

- Wath Brow Hornets 10−11 Siddal
- Rochdale Mayfield 22−6 Thatto Heath Crusaders

Semi-finals

- Rochdale Mayfield 14−8 Siddal
- Hunslet 40−18 West Hull

Preliminary Final

- West Hull 28−8 Rochdale Mayfield

Final

- Hunslet 20−6 West Hull

== Division One ==
POS	CLUB	P	W	L	D	PF	PA	DIFF	PTS
1	West Bowling	20	17	3	0	686	346	340	34
2	Egremont Rangers	20	15	5	0	706	334	372	30
3	Heworth	20	13	7	0	596	348	248	26
4	Stanningley	20	12	7	1	547	410	137	25
5	Oulton Raiders	20	10	7	3	442	406	36	23
6	Skirlaugh	20	11	9	0	420	435	-15	22
7	Clock Face Miners	20	9	10	1	364	544	-180	19
8	Crosfields	20	9	11	0	456	542	-86	18
9	Ince Rose Bridge	20	6	13	1	370	580	-210	13
10	Pilkington Recs	20	4	15	1	352	568	-216	9
11	Thornhill Trojans	20	0	19	1	312	738	-426	1

== Division Two ==
POS	CLUB	P	W	L	D	PF	PA	DIFF	PTS
1	Waterhead Warriors	22	20	2	0	835	260	575	40
2	Dewsbury Moor Maroons	22	16	6	0	581	323	258	32
3	Shaw Cross Sharks	22	14	7	1	540	446	94	29
4	Woolston Rovers	22	12	10	0	505	443	62	24
5	Wigan St Judes	22	11	11	0	528	504	24	22
6	Saddleworth Rangers	22	11	11	0	430	549	-119	22
7	Dewsbury Celtic	22	10	12	0	494	418	76	20
8	Normanton Knights	22	9	12	1	446	542	-96	19
9	Barrow Island	22	9	12	1	377	590	-213	19
10	Myton Warriors	22	8	13	1	524	619	-95	17
11	East Leeds	22	5	17	0	412	685	-273	10
12	Milford	22	5	17	0	384	677	-293	10

== Division Three ==
POS	CLUB	P	W	L	D	PF	PA	DIFF	PTS
1	Oldham St Annes	18	14	4	0	616	268	348	28
2	Ellenborough	18	14	4	0	620	275	345	28
3	Millom	18	13	5	0	554	299	255	26
4	Leigh East	18	13	5	0	532	280	252	26
5	Drighlington	18	8	9	1	405	454	-49	17
6	Beverley	18	7	10	1	417	386	31	15
7	Bentley	18	7	10	1	332	396	-64	15
8	Eastmoor Dragons	18	6	12	0	331	565	-234	12
9	Hensingham	18	3	14	1	244	559	-315	7
10	Seaton Rangers	18	3	15	0	184	753	-569	6
