= 2021 National Conference League =

- League: National Conference League

2021 Season
- Champions: Thatto Heath Crusaders
- League Leaders: N/A

The 2021 National Conference League was the 36th season of the National Conference League, the top league for British amateur rugby league clubs.

Due to the COVID-19 pandemic the tournament had a temporary restructure from its traditional four tiers involving small local round robins across seven areas with the winners and runners-up of each group, as well as a further two teams, entering a playoff system cumulating in one grand final for all four divisions.

== Group A ==
Askam withdrew from the league during the middle of the season.

| POS | CLUB | P | W | L | D | PF | PA | DIFF | PTS | DIF% | WP% |
| 1 | Wath Brow Hornets | 6 | 6 | 0 | 0 | 247 | 50 | 494.00 | 12 | 494.00 | 100.00 |
| 2 | Kells | 8 | 6 | 2 | 0 | 309 | 156 | 198.08 | 12 | 198.08 | 75.00 |
| 3 | Egremont Rangers | 8 | 5 | 3 | 0 | 201 | 134 | 150.00 | 10 | 150.00 | 62.50 |
| 4 | Barrow Island | 10 | 5 | 5 | 0 | 186 | 234 | 79.49 | 10 | 79.49 | 50.00 |
| 5 | Millom | 9 | 2 | 7 | 0 | 134 | 331 | 40.48 | 4 | 40.48 | 22.22 |
| 6 | Hensingham | 7 | 1 | 6 | 0 | 106 | 226 | 46.90 | 2 | 46.90 | 14.29 |
| 7 | Askam | 2 | 0 | 2 | 0 | 16 | 68 | 23.53 | 0 | 23.53 | 0.00 |

== Group B ==
| POS | CLUB | P | W | L | D | PF | PA | DIFF | PTS | DIF% | WP% |
| 1 | Thatto Heath Crusaders | 12 | 10 | 1 | 1 | 394 | 119 | 331.09 | 21 | 331.09 | 87.50 |
| 2 | Pilkington Recs | 12 | 8 | 4 | 0 | 332 | 174 | 190.0 | 16 | 190.80 | 66.67 |
| 3 | Leigh Miners Rangers | 13 | 8 | 5 | 0 | 356 | 264 | 134.85 | 16 | 134.85 | 61.54 |
| 4 | Wigan St Patricks | 14 | 8 | 5 | 1 | 315 | 233 | 135.19 | 17 | 135.19 | 60.71 |
| 5 | Ince Rose Bridge | 12 | 4 | 8 | 0 | 243 | 381 | 63.78 | 8 | 63.78 | 33.33 |
| 6 | Leigh East | 10 | 2 | 8 | 0 | 138 | 274 | 50.36 | 4 | 50.36 | 20.00 |
| 7 | Wigan St Judes | 12 | 1 | 11 | 0 | 174 | 432 | 40.28 | 2 | 40.28 | 8.33 |

== Group C ==
| POS | CLUB | P | W | L | D | PF | PA | DIFF | PTS | DIF% | WP% |
| 1 | Crosfields | 14 | 10 | 4 | 0 | 398 | 343 | 116.03 | 20 | 116.03 | 71.43 |
| 2 | Rochdale Mayfield | 13 | 9 | 4 | 0 | 395 | 310 | 127.42 | 18 | 127.42 | 69.23 |
| 3 | Clock Face Miners | 12 | 8 | 4 | 0 | 312 | 227 | 137.44 | 16 | 137.44 | 66.67 |
| 4 | Woolston Rovers | 13 | 8 | 5 | 0 | 291 | 256 | 113.67 | 16 | 113.67 | 61.54 |
| 5 | Oldham St Annes | 11 | 4 | 7 | 0 | 223 | 291 | 76.63 | 8 | 76.63 | 36.36 |
| 6 | Waterhead Warriors | 13 | 3 | 10 | 0 | 209 | 313 | 66.77 | 6 | 66.77 | 23.08 |
| 7 | Saddleworth Rangers | 14 | 3 | 11 | 0 | 228 | 434 | 52.53 | 6 | 52.53 | 21.43 |

== Group D ==
| POS | CLUB | P | W | L | D | PF | PA | DIFF | PTS | DIF% | WP% |
| 1 | Siddal | 14 | 13 | 1 | 0 | 476 | 118 | 403.39 | 26 | 403.39 | 92.86 |
| 2 | Hunslet Club Parkside | 12 | 11 | 1 | 0 | 466 | 120 | 388.33 | 22 | 388.33 | 91.67 |
| 3 | Stanningley | 12 | 8 | 4 | 0 | 309 | 266 | 116.17 | 16 | 116.17 | 66.67 |
| 4 | East Leeds | 11 | 6 | 5 | 0 | 239 | 176 | 135.80 | 12 | 135.80 | 54.55 |
| 5 | Hunslet Warriors | 11 | 3 | 8 | 0 | 143 | 376 | 38.03 | 6 | 38.03 | 27.27 |
| 6 | Oulton Raiders | 13 | 3 | 10 | 0 | 176 | 283 | 62.19 | 6 | 62.19 | 23.08 |
| 7 | Milford | 12 | 1 | 11 | 0 | 130 | 394 | 32.99 | 2 | 32.99 | 8.33 |

== Group E ==
Gateshead Storm withdrew from the league during the middle of the season.

| POS | CLUB | P | W | L | D | PF | PA | DIFF | PTS | DIF% | WP% |
| 1 | Normanton Knights | 13 | 10 | 3 | 0 | 379 | 208 | 182.21 | 20 | 182.21 | 76.92 |
| 2 | Dewsbury Moor Maroons | 13 | 7 | 5 | 1 | 256 | 216 | 118.52 | 15 | 118.52 | 57.69 |
| 3 | Eastmoor Dragons | 10 | 5 | 4 | 1 | 208 | 227 | 91.63 | 11 | 91.63 | 55.00 |
| 4 | Dewsbury Celtic | 12 | 5 | 7 | 0 | 300 | 337 | 89.02 | 10 | 89.02 | 41.67 |
| 5 | Batley Boys | 10 | 3 | 7 | 0 | 183 | 340 | 53.82 | 6 | 53.82 | 30.00 |
| 6 | Gateshead Storm | 4 | 1 | 3 | 0 | 66 | 176 | 37.50 | 2 | 37.50 | 25.00 |
| 7 | Shaw Cross Sharks | 11 | 2 | 9 | 0 | 194 | 288 | 67.36 | 4 | 67.36 | 18.18 |

== Group F ==
| POS | CLUB | P | W | L | D | PF | PA | DIFF | PTS | DIF% | WP% |
| 1 | West Bowling | 11 | 11 | 0 | 0 | 508 | 94 | 540.43 | 22 | 540.43 | 100.00 |
| 2 | Lock Lane | 13 | 9 | 4 | 0 | 411 | 191 | 215.18 | 18 | 215.18 | 69.23 |
| 3 | Bradford Dudley Hill | 12 | 6 | 6 | 0 | 255 | 250 | 102.00 | 12 | 102.00 | 50.00 |
| 4 | Underbank Rangers | 12 | 6 | 6 | 0 | 249 | 276 | 90.22 | 12 | 90.22 | 50.00 |
| 5 | Thornhill Trojans | 12 | 6 | 6 | 0 | 272 | 312 | 87.18 | 12 | 87.18 | 50.00 |
| 6 | Featherstone Lions | 13 | 4 | 9 | 0 | 248 | 356 | 69.66 | 8 | 69.66 | 30.77 |
| 7 | Drighlington | 13 | 0 | 13 | 0 | 142 | 474 | 29.96 | 0 | 29.96 | 0.00 |

== Group G ==
| POS | CLUB | P | W | L | D | PF | PA | DIFF | PTS | DIF% | WP% |
| 1 | Heworth | 11 | 9 | 2 | 0 | 276 | 167 | 165.27 | 18 | 165.27 | 81.82 |
| 2 | West Hull | 13 | 10 | 3 | 0 | 406 | 127 | 319.69 | 20 | 319.69 | 76.92 |
| 3 | York Acorn | 13 | 9 | 4 | 0 | 305 | 185 | 164.86 | 18 | 164.86 | 69.23 |
| 4 | Skirlaugh | 11 | 6 | 5 | 0 | 212 | 211 | 100.47 | 12 | 100.47 | 54.55 |
| 5 | Hull Dockers | 14 | 6 | 8 | 0 | 246 | 373 | 65.95 | 12 | 65.95 | 42.86 |
| 6 | Beverley | 12 | 3 | 9 | 0 | 146 | 310 | 47.10 | 6 | 47.10 | 25.00 |
| 7 | Myton Warriors | 14 | 2 | 12 | 0 | 188 | 548 | 34.31 | 4 | 34.31 | 14.29 |

== Playoffs ==
=== Round of 16 ===
- Thatto Heath Crusaders 74-6 Kells
- West Brow Hornets 60-12 Leigh Miners Rangers
- Siddal 20-8 West Hull
- Hunslet Club Parkside 32-12 Rochdale Mayfield
- Normanton Knights 22-32 Underbank Rangers
- Crossfield 20-42 Pilkington Recs
- West Bowling 28-8 Dewsbury Moor Maroons
- Heworth 34-38 Lock Lane

=== Quarter Finals ===
- Thatto Heath Crusaders 14-12 Siddal
- Pilkington Recs 11-0 Lock Lane
- Underbank Rangers 0-42 Hunslet Club Parkside
- Wath Brow Hornets 18-8 West Bowling

=== Semi Finals ===
- Thatto Heath Crusaders 18-16 Hunslet Club Parkside
- Wath Brow Hornets 44-8 Pilkington Recs

=== Grand Final ===
- Thatto Heath Crusaders 18-10 Wath Brow Hornets
