= Thornhill Trojans =

English amateur rugby league club

Club information
- Full name: Thronhill Trojans; Amateur Rugby League Football Club
- Founded: 1988; 38 years ago

Current details
- Ground: Thornhill Sports & Community Centre Overthorpe Park, Edge Top Road Thornhill, Dewsbury West Yorkshire WF12 0DP
- Competition: National Conference League Premier Division

Thornhill Trojans are an amateur rugby league club situated in Thornhill, West Yorkshire; they currently compete in the National Conference League Premier Division

== Formation ==
Thornhill ARLFC was formed in 1988 at a meeting held at Thornhill Edge Club, attended by Thornhill Gate Officials, players and supporters along with Thornhill Lees Juniors parents and officials.

Previously to that, Rugby League in the Thornhill area had been played under the Overthorpe Rangers and Gate Inn Banner. The club started by electing to have Overthorpe Sports Club as the club's headquarters.

Players still had to get changed in the old council building at the entrance to Overthorpe Park, but a lot of people rallied round and the old dressing rooms were given a face-lift in 1994 when a lot of players got involved to improve the facility. This included the fabrication, erecting and welding of new rugby posts, and barriers around the field with an army of helpers. An old joiners shop at the top of the yard was also converted to make 2 more dressing rooms, showering facilities, and a tea room. Overthorpe also had two dressing rooms, so at one specific time three games could actually be played at once.

== League entry ==
In the summer of 1994, the club applied for National Conference Membership after having good cup runs in the County Cups under Johnny Harpin's astute coaching. At Christmas 1994, Thornhill played Blackpool and qualified for the very first time into the Rugby League cup on 1 May. In January 1995 the club drew Hull KR away on Sunday 13 January, but on that occasion the game was called off at approximately 10.30 am. The game was rescheduled on 15 January at 7.30 pm. Seven supporters buses were taken to Hull for the game and Andy Smith became the first Thornhill player to score a try in the Rugby League Cup, although Thornhill were beaten.

== Promotion and League Cup games ==
The club secured promotion in its first season in the NCL and at the end of the year also qualified for the club's only appearance in the County Cup Final versus Skirlaugh at Tetley's Stadium, Dewsbury on 23 December 1995. In front of 2500 spectators Thornhill were beaten by Skirlaugh who took the trophy winning 11–6 with Steve Barwick scoring Thornhill's only try. Further big games were to follow, and Thornhill went to Swinton in 1996, Featherstone in 1997 and Dewsbury in 1998 in the Rugby League Cup. In the 2000 Challenge Cup, Thornhill travelled to Sheffield to play the 1998 cup winners, Sheffield Eagles. Thornhill pulled off an upset, winning 16–14 against their professional opposition. This being the first time a Heavy Woollen Club had achieved this. At the 2009–10 National Conference League Awards evening held at Headingley Stadium, the club won Programme of the Year and Andrew Byram was Secretary of the year.

In the meantime, the club were chasing the Lottery to get a grant for a brand new clubhouse. In 2001, Thornhill played Hunslet, in 2003 it was Keighley and then in 2006, Thornhill struck again by beating a professional club. The victims being Workington Town at Rams Stadium. The reward for this was a trip to France to play Catalans Dragons. This was followed by a National Conference Grand Final at Mount Pleasant against Oulton, unfortunately losing the game. The game hit the head lines for all the wrong reasons with crowd trouble in the main stand prior to the trophy presentations. The club was handed a £1,000 fine for this and suffered a 4-point deduction at the start of the 2006–07 league season. Former Super League star Paul March took over as head coach immediately after the Grand Final defeat. In 2007, the club played Strela Kazan, Russian side in the Carnegie Challenge Cup. The game was staged in Overthrope Park with a crowd of over 1,500 present. When Paul March left to become coach at York City Knights, player Scott Dyson took the helm as player / coach. Under Dyson the club pulled off some battling performances to hang onto their Conference Premier Division status, however having avoided relegation, a 76–0 hammering at Leigh Miners on the last day of the 2007/08 season was the beginning of the end.

The club were relegated from the National Conference Premier Division after registering only 2 wins all season during 2008–09. Robin Jowitt resigned as coach in November 2008. Joint coaches Keith Mason and Richard Butterworth managed to register league wins over Leigh East and East Hull. However, after a home defeat to Skirlaugh the coaching duties were handed over to Andy Kelly.

Under the guidance of Andy Kelly, the club competed in the 2009 National Conference Summer League and reached the semi-finals.

The club made a promising start to life in National Conference League Division One and were amongst the early runners for promotion. However, after the departure of coach Andy Kelly the club entered another downward spiral.

Senior player Wayne Loney took over as coach during a difficult period for the club. Despite some encouraging wins over Heworth and Saddleworth the club finished in the relegation zone. The club record defeat was recorded when they lost 102–4 at Thatto Heath.

Relegation to the Conference 2nd Division was prevented when the NCL restructured and it was announced that Thornhill would retain their Division 1 status. However, in the summer of 2010 the club hit rock bottom. Due to a lack of players at Open Age Level and financial difficulties off the field, the club decided to withdraw their membership of the National Conference League and run one team in the Pennine League. The club took up the place in Division 3 of the Pennine League which had been reserved for their defunct 'A' team.

The club restructured off the field during the summer of 2010 to ensure all historic debts could be serviced and began a rebuilding process at Open Age level.

The club ended the 2010–11 season as Pennine League Division 3 Champions. The club re-formed its second team in the 2011/12 season. Wayne Loney moved to be assistant coach, with former York City Knights boss James Ratcliffe becoming head coach.

In December 2011, they reached the final of the Hamuel Reichenbacher Yorkshire Cup Final beating Queen's in the semi-final after Liam Morley converted a golden point. In front of over 3000 people at Belle Vue, Wakefield they narrowly lost to Hunslet Old Boys. The club finished unbeaten 2nd Division Champions and the 'A' team were unbeaten Division 7 Champions. The club also won the Andrew Bennett Memorial Trophy beating Methley Royals. At the Pennine League end of season dinner Thornhill were awarded the Chairman's Special Award and long serving Secretary Andrew Byram was named Club Person of the Year.

In the summer of 2012, the club received the news that the Pennine League had fast-tracked them from Division 2 to the Pennine Premier Division. The club's 'A' team were moved up to Division 4.
