= 2016 National Conference League =

- League: National Conference League
- Teams: 48

2016 Season
- Champions: Siddal
- League Leaders: Siddal

The 2016 National Conference League was the 31st season of the National Conference League, the top league for British amateur rugby league clubs.

The following are the results for each season:

== Premier Division ==
POS	CLUB	P	W	L	D	PF	PA	DIFF	PTS
1	Siddal (C)	22	18	4	0	669	336	333	36
2	West Hull	22	15	7	0	540	358	182	30
3	Leigh Miners Rangers	22	15	7	0	558	434	124	30
4	Rochdale Mayfield	22	14	7	1	638	432	206	29
5	Wath Brow Hornets	22	13	8	1	467	430	37	27
6	Wigan St Patricks	22	11	10	1	474	511	-37	23
7	Kells	22	11	10	1	394	440	-46	23
8	Pilkington Recs	22	10	10	2	554	459	95	22
9	Egremont Rangers	22	7	14	1	374	553	-179	15
10	Lock Lane	22	6	16	0	450	566	-116	12
11	Hull Dockers	22	5	16	1	372	651	-279	11
12	York Acorn	22	3	19	0	425	745	-320	6

=== Playoffs ===
Eliminatiors

- Rochdale Mayfield 50-16 Wath Brow Hornets
- Leigh Miners Rangers 36-16 Wigan St Patricks

Semi-finals

- Siddal 22-6 West Hull
- Leigh Miners Rangers 34-24 Rochdale Mayfield

Preliminary Final

- West Hull 20-22 Leigh Miners Rangers

Grand Final

- Siddal 42-4 Leigh Miners Rangers

== Division One ==
Elland were relegated to Division Three after failing to fulfil a fixture.

POS	CLUB	P	W	L	D	PF	PA	DIFF	PTS
1	Thatto Heath Crusaders	26	23	3	0	946	399	547	46
2	Myton Warriors	26	21	5	0	803	400	403	42
3	Skirlaugh	26	18	8	0	872	546	326	36
4	Featherstone Lions	26	17	9	0	914	590	324	34
5	Milford Marlins	26	16	10	0	650	479	171	32
6	Normanton Knights	26	14	11	1	712	539	173	29
7	Underbank Rangers	26	14	12	0	750	549	201	28
8	Ince Rose Bridge	26	11	15	0	655	683	-28	22
9	Oulton Raiders	26	11	15	0	552	708	-156	22
10	Shaw Cross Sharks	26	10	15	1	565	633	-68	21
11	Hunslet Warriors	26	10	15	1	586	676	-90	21
12	East Leeds	26	10	15	1	636	754	-118	21
13	Millom	26	4	22	0	446	962	-516	8
14		26	1	25	0	296	1465	-1169	2

- Skirlaugh were deducted 2 points for fielding an ineligible player.

== Division Two ==
POS	CLUB	P	W	L	D	PF	PA	DIFF	PTS
1	Hunslet Club Parkside	22	20	2	0	897	284	613	40
2	Askam	22	15	6	1	632	396	236	31
3	Blackbrook	22	15	7	0	621	490	131	30
4	Thornhill Trojans	22	12	6	4	625	416	209	28
5	Leigh East	22	13	9	0	788	451	337	26
6	Bradford Dudley Hill	22	13	9	0	604	484	120	26
7	Saddleworth Rangers	22	12	8	2	571	510	61	26
8	Wigan St Judes	22	12	10	0	679	496	183	24
9	Dewsbury Celtic	22	5	16	1	292	774	-482	11
10	Salford City Roosters	22	4	16	2	331	593	-262	10
11	Stanningley	22	4	18	0	338	780	-442	8
12	Stanley Rangers	22	1	19	2	256	960	-704	4

== Division Three ==
Rylands Sharks were elected into the league for the first time in the club's history.

Castleford Panthers withdrew from the league during the middle of the season.

POS	CLUB	P	W	L	D	PF	PA	DIFF	PTS
1	Crosfields	16	14	1	1	541	281	260	29
2	Drighlington	15	12	3	0	499	264	235	24
3	Woolston Rovers	16	12	4	0	492	353	139	24
4	Eastmoor Dragons	16	8	7	1	366	372	-6	17
5		16	7	8	1	537	424	113	15
6	Oldham St Annes	16	5	10	1	352	499	-147	11
7	Waterhead Warriors	16	5	11	0	328	502	-174	10
8	Dewsbury Moor Maroons	15	4	11	0	289	442	-153	8
9	Gateshead Storm	16	2	14	0	300	567	-267	4
10	Castleford Panthers	0	0	0	0	0	0	0	0
