= National Conference League =

Rugby league in the UK

- Sport: Rugby league
- Formerly known as: BARLA National League
- Instituted: 1987
- Ceased: 2026
- Replaced by: National Community Rugby League
- Number of teams: 72
- Country: England
- Champions: West Hull (2025/26)
- Most titles: West Hull (10 titles)

The National Conference League (NCL) was part of the British rugby league system at the top end of the amateur pyramid below the professional Championship. It came under the jurisdiction of the Rugby Football League (RFL). It was replaced by the National Community Rugby League.

== History ==
In the early days, rugby league had an established structure outside of the professional leagues with county-wide competitions. This decayed into local district leagues usually only featuring teams from one or two towns with no input from the professional game. This eventually saw the number of amateur rugby league clubs reduce to 150 in the early 1970s.

Against this background, the British Amateur Rugby League Association was formed in 1973. One of its first acts was to merge most of the district leagues into three regional leagues: the Yorkshire League, the Pennine League and the North Western Counties League. For geographical reasons, the Hull League, the Cumberland League, the Barrow League and the London League were left as they were.

This allowed clubs to play at more appropriate standards as there were more divisions, and this factor - along with the improved governance of BARLA - saw the standard and numbers of clubs rise quickly. However, while there was a National Cup, the best amateur clubs were still divided between six leagues and thus the desire for an amateur National League arose.

The BARLA National League was formed in 1986. It received 27 applications including five from the Barrow area, and more unusually, one from a London club, South London Warriors.

In the end the league settled on 10 members, all from the northern strongholds of the game. These were four clubs from Yorkshire: Dudley Hill, Milford Marlins, Heworth and West Hull; four clubs from Lancashire: Pilkington Recs, Wigan St Patrick's, Woolston Rovers and Leigh Miners' Welfare; and two clubs from Cumbria: Egremont Rangers and Millom. These ten clubs were to be the members for each of the first three seasons.

The National League soon proved popular. For the 1989/90 season, the top flight was extended to 12 teams to include Lock Lane and Mayfield. However, this modest expansion wasn't enough and the 1989/90 season also saw the addition of a 10-team second division (to expand to 12 teams after one season).

The ten inaugural members of the second division were: Saddleworth Rangers, Leigh East, British Aerospace, Barrow Island, Askam, Knottingley, Redhill, Dewsbury Celtic, Shaw Cross Sharks and East Leeds. This expansion proved successful with Leigh East becoming the first non-founder members to win the league, in the 1990/91 season.

In 1993, the RFL wanted to contract the professional ranks from 35 to 32 teams. However, their initial plan to place the excluded teams in the Alliance (reserve grade) faced a legal challenge so they needed an alternative competition for them. The RFL thus proposed a league to bridge the gap between the professional and amateur leagues to feature the three demoted semi-pro clubs plus Hemel Hempstead (who already played in the Alliance as a semi-pro club) and eight BARLA clubs.

However, BARLA wanted all National League clubs to be in any such league and since the RFL were in a tough legal position they were prepared to compromise with BARLA and thus the three division NCL was born. Other concessions included an increase in the BARLA representation in the Challenge Cup from two clubs to 64 and allowing the NCL champions to apply to replace the bottom team in the pro leagues.

The latter concession soon disappeared as the pro leagues moved to summer and the National Conference League did not want to move. Also, Woolston Rovers' application to replace Highfield was voted out (the one club elected to the league from the NCL being Chorley Borough who were themselves a former semi-pro league club). The NCL soon expanded all divisions to 14 teams, though on occasions it has struggled to reach full complement of members, and lost all the remaining semi-pro clubs within three seasons.

After the switch of the pro game to summer, the NCL became solely a BARLA league, despite being temporarily expelled from BARLA in 2002. Initially, only three NCL teams joined National League Three (intended to bridge the gap between the pro and amateur games) but this changed in 2008 when the NCL downgraded the league's BARLA membership from full to associate. In 2009 the NCL introduced a summer competition for clubs wanting to play year round as a test for a more permanent switch to summer which came in 2012.

From 2012 the Conference played in summer, as tier 3 of the new pyramid, and the initial season saw two former Rugby League Conference National Division clubs admitted (Dewsbury Celtic and Featherstone Lions) with others expected to join from 2013. For one season only the Rugby League Conference National Division ran as Conference division three with no automatic promotion to division two, but after this, all northern clubs were required to meet full Conference criteria to play in tier 3. The RFL also had ambitions of a Conference South which would leave the former NCL as Conference North. From 2013, the limit on member clubs was raised from 42 to 56 and saw an increase to four divisions.

At the end of 2025 the RFL launched its National Community Rugby League initiative which proposed replacing the NCL with two national leagues and a number of regional leagues. While most clubs were not in favour of the initiative, the clubs decided to agree to the proposal "for the good of the sport". The NCL clubs met on 19 January and agreed to dissolve the NCL.

== Premier Division ==
=== Results ===
Season	Winner	Score	Runners-up	Relegated
1986–87	Heworth	N/A	West Hull	N/A
1987–88	Milford	N/A	West Hull	N/A
1988–89	West Hull	N/A	Wigan St Patricks	N/A
1989–90	Bradford Dudley Hill	N/A	Egremont Rangers	Milford; Lock Lane
1990–91	Leigh East	N/A	Leigh Miners Rangers	West Hull
1991–92	Wigan St Patricks	N/A	Saddleworth Rangers	Barrow Island; Rochdale Mayfield
1992–93	Saddleworth Rangers	N/A	Egremont Rangers	N/A
1993–94	Woolston Rovers	N/A	Chorley	Blackpool Gladiators; Nottingham City
1994–95	Woolston Rovers (2)	N/A	Heworth	Askam
1995–96	Woolston Rovers (3)	N/A	Wigan St Patricks	Millom
1996–97	West Hull (2)	N/A	Woolston Rovers	N/A
1997–98	Egremont Rangers	N/A	Woolston Rovers	Rochdale Mayfield; Lock Lane
1998–99	West Hull (3)	N/A	Skirlaugh	Heworth
1999–00	West Hull (4)	N/A	Skirlaugh	Askam
2000–01	West Hull (5)	N/A	Woolston Rovers	Bradford Dudley Hill; Redhill
2001–02	West Hull (6)	24-20	Oulton Raiders	Walney Central; Saddleworth Rangers
2002–03	Siddal	19-14	West Hull	East Leeds
2003–04	Siddal (2)	18-16	Skirlaugh	Lock Lane; Ideal Isburg; Featherstone Lions
2004–05	Leigh Miners Rangers	30-22	Wath Brow Hornets	West Hull; West Bowling; Thatto Heath Crusaders
2005–06	Oulton Raiders	20-11	Wigan St Patricks	Eccles & Salford; Leigh East; Wigan St Judes
2006–07	Skirlaugh	8-6	Leigh Miners Rangers	Oldham St Annes; Wath Brow Hornets; Shaw Cross Sharks
2007–08	East Hull	26-10	Leigh Miners Rangers	Castleford Panthers; West Bowling; Eastmoor Dragons
2008–09	Siddal (3)	15-8	East Hull	Thatto Heath Crusaders; Rochdale Mayfield; Thornhill Trojans
2009–10	Leigh East (2)	37-10	Siddal	Oulton Raiders; Ince Rose Bridge; Widnes St Maries
2010–11	Thatto Heath Crusaders	30-18	Siddal	Bradford Dudley Hill; Wigan St Judes; York Acorn
2012	Wath Brow Hornets	22-6	Myton Warriors	Leigh East; Oulton Raiders; Saddleworth Rangers
2013	West Hull (7)	16-12	Wath Brow Hornets	York Acorn; Myton Warriors; Ince Rose Bridge
2014	West Hull (8)	20-8	Wath Brow Hornets (3)	Skirlaugh; Hunslet Warriors; Wigan St Judes
2015	Leigh Miners Rangers (2)	22-20	Siddal	East Leeds; Thatto Heath Crusaders; Oulton Raiders
2016	Siddal (4)	42-4	Leigh Miners Rangers	Lock Lane; Hull Dockers; York Acorn
2017	Thatto Heath Crusaders (2)	18-12	Siddal	Pilkington Recs; Leigh Miners Rangers
2018	Hunslet Club Parkside	26-18	West Hull	Normanton Knights; Wigan St Patricks; Myton Warriors
2019	West Hull (9)	18-14 (GP)	Thatto Heath Crusaders	Leigh Miners Rangers; Thornhill Trojans; Kells
2020	Tournament curtailed due to the COVID-19 pandemic			
2021	Tournament restructured due to the COVID-19 pandemic			
2022	Hunslet Club Parkside (2)	18-14	West Hull	Pilkington Recs; Thornhill Trojans; Egremont Rangers
2023	Hunslet ARLFC	20-6	West Hull	Leigh Miners Rangers; Wigan St Patricks; Hull Dockers
2024	Hunslet ARLFC (2)	24-12	Siddal	Heworth; Kells; Egremont Rangers
2025	West Hull (10)	8-0	Siddal	Lock Lane; Dewsbury Moor; Leigh Miners Rangers

=== Winners ===
	Club	Wins	Runners up	Winning years
1	West Hull	10	6	1988–89, 1996–97, 1998–99, 1999–00, 2000–01, 2001–02, 2013, 2014, 2019, 2025
2	Siddal	5	6	2002–03, 2003–04, 2008–09, 2016, 2017
3	Woolston Rovers	3	3	1993–94, 1994–95, 1995–96
4	Leigh Miners Rangers	2	4	2004–05, 2015
4	Leigh East	2	0	1990–91, 2009–10
4	Hunslet Club Parkside	2	0	2018, 2022
4	Hunslet ARLFC	2	0	2023, 2024
5	Skirlaugh	1	3	2006–07
5	Wath Brow Hornets	1	3	2012
5	Wigan St Patricks	1	2	1991–92
5	Egremont Rangers	1	2	1997–98
5	Heworth	1	1	1986–87
5	Saddleworth Rangers	1	1	1992–93
5	Oulton Raiders	1	1	2005–06
5	East Hull	1	1	2007–08
5	Thatto Heath Crusaders	1	1	2010–11
5	Milford	1	0	1987–88
5	Bradford Dudley Hill	1	0	1989–90

== Division One ==
=== Results ===
Season	Winners	Runners up	Relegated
1989–90	Saddleworth Rangers	Leigh East	N//A
1990–91	Barrow Island	Askam	N//A
1991–92	West Hull	Dewsbury Celtic	N//A
1992–93	Rochdale Mayfield	Oulton Raiders	N//A
1993–94	Heworth	Mayfield	N//A
1994–95	Millom	Lock Lane	N//A
1995–96	Beverley	Oldham St Anne’s	N//A
1996–97	Askam	Walney Central	Millom
1997–98	Skirlaugh	Thornhill Trojans	Blackbrook Royals
1998–99	Redhill	Bradford Dudley Hill	Milford; Eastmoor Dragons
1999–00	Oulton Raiders	Ideal Isburg	Blackbrook Royals
2000–01	Leigh East	Siddal	Heworth; Millom
2001–02	West Bowling	East Leeds	Rochdale Mayfield; Eastmoor Dragons
2002–03	Thatto Heath Crusaders	Featherstone Lions	Waterhead Warriors
2003–04	Wath Brow Hornets	Wigan St Judes	Saddleworth Rangers; Crosfield
2004–05	Shaw Cross Sharks	East Hull	Castleford Panthers; Featherstone Lions
2005–06	West Hull (2)	West Bowling	Askam; Ideal Isburg
2006–07	Rochdale Mayfield (2)	Castleford Panthers	Lock Lane; Milford; Ovenden
2007–08	Wigan St Judes	York Acorn	Eccles & Salford; Waterhead Warriors; East Leeds
2008–09	Wath Brow Hornets (2)	Ince Rose Bridge	Eastmoor Dragons; Oldham St Annes; Shaw Cross Sharks
2009–10	Thatto Heath Crusaders	Bradford Dudley Hill	West Bowling; Heworth
2010–11	Oulton Raiders (2)	Myton Warriors	Normanton Knights
2012	Egremont Rangers	Lock Lane	Stanningley; Oldham St Annes; Castleford Panthers
2013	East Leeds	Hunslet Warriors	Stanley Rangers; Saddleworth Rangers; Waterhead Warriors
2014	Oulton Raiders (3)	Rochdale Mayfield	Dewsbury Celtic; Millom

Season	Winners	Runners up	Playoff Winner	Score	Playoff Runner up	Relegated
2015	Kells	Pilkington Recs	York Acorn	30-22	Normanton Knights	Salford City Roosters; Wigan St Judes; Saddleworth Rangers
2016	Thatto Heath Crusaders (2)	Myton Warriors	Skirlaugh	25-18	Featherstone Lions	East Leeds; Milliom; Elland
2017	Hunslet Club Parkside	Oulton Raiders	Normanton Knights	22-20	Milford	Hunslet Warriors; Hull Dockers; Blackbroom
2018	Thornhill Trojans	Lock Lane	Leigh Miners Rangers	23-22 (GP)	Milford	Ince Rose Bridge; Shaw Cross Sharks; Bradford Dudley Hill
2019	Pilkington Recs	York Acorn	Featherstone Lions	23-10	Stanningley	Saddleworth Rangers; Normanton Knights; Dewsbury Moor
2020	Tournament curtailed due to the COVID-19 pandemic					
2021	Tournament restructured due to the COVID-19 pandemic					
2022	Kells (2)	Wigan St Patricks	No playoff was held			Saddleworth Rangers; Myton Warriors; Milford
2023	West Bowling (2)	Egremont Rangers	Heworth	46-6	Oulton Raiders	Pilkington Recs; Thornhill Trojans
2024	Waterhead Warriors	Leigh Miners Rangers	Dewsbury Moor	16-10	Ince Rose Bridge	Hull Dockers; Clock Face Miners; Skirlaugh
2025	Wigan St Judes (2)	Heworth	Ince Rose Bridge	18-14	Stanningley	Oulton Raiders; Crosfields; Woolston Rovers

=== Winners ===
	Club	Wins	Runners up	Winning years
1	Oulton Raiders	3	2	2005–06, 2010–11, 2014
2	Rochdale Mayfield	2	2	1992–93, 2006–07
2	West Hull	2	0	1991–92, 2005–06
2	Thatto Heath Crusaders	2	0	2002–03, 2016
2	Wath Brow Hornets	2	0	2003–04, 2008–09
2	Kells	2	0	2015, 2022
2	Wigan St Judes	2	0	2007–08, 2025
3
3	Askam	1	1	1996–97
3	Leigh East	1	1	2000–01
3	West Bowling	1	1	2001–02
3	Egremont Rangers	1	1	2012
3	East Leeds	1	1	2013
3	Thornhill Trojans	1	1	2018
3	Pilkington Recs	1	1	2019
3	Saddleworth Rangers	1	0	1989–90
3	Barrow Island	1	0	1990–91
3	Heworth	1	0	1993–94
3	Millom	1	0	1994–95
3	Beverley	1	0	1995–96
3	Skirlaugh	1	0	1997–98
3	Redhill	1	0	1998–99
3	Shaw Cross Sharks	1	0	2004–05
3	West Hull	1	0	2005–06
3	Hunslet Club Parkside	1	0	2017
3	Waterhead Warriors	1	0	2024

== See also ==
- Conference League South
- Conference Challenge Trophy
