= Myton Warriors =

English amateur rugby league club

Club information
- Full name: Myton Warriors; Amateur Rugby League Football Club
- Colours: Green, Red & Black
- Founded: 1997; 29 years ago

Current details
- Ground: Marist Sporting Club, Cranbrook Avenue, Cottingham Road, Hull, HU6 7TX
- Competition: NCL Division Three

Myton Warriors are an amateur rugby league club based in the Myton area of Kingston upon Hull, East Riding of Yorkshire. They compete in the BARLA National Conference League Premier Division, the top tier of amateur rugby league in England, and the fourth overall tier of rugby league in England. The Warriors have local rivalries with Skirlaugh, West Hull, East Hull, and Hull Dockers.

== History and formation ==
The Myton Warriors were formed in 1997 after previously being called Bay Horse A.R.L.F.C., playing in Division 1 of the Hull & District League. They made the second round of the 1998 Challenge Cup, after defeating London Skolars 12–10.

The Myton committee were approached by the Northern Dairies youth section in 1999, who proposed a merger between the open-age and youth teams from both clubs. This merger happened a year later.

Both club's committees merged and formed the club's current committee, after three years of playing from a local high school. Marist Rugby Union club approached the club in 1999 and offered to share their facilities with Myton. The Warriors have played at the Marist Rugby Union club grounds from that time. The facilities have now been developed to house rugby league, rugby union and football games on Saturdays and Sundays in winter, and cricket in the summer. It is now administrated by a committee in the name of the Marist Sporting Club in all sections.

Myton competed in the Yorkshire League for seven years and gained promotion in 2005/06 after they were Senior Division One champions. The following season Myton finished second in the league and runners-up in the play-offs. They also won the Yorkshire Cup in the 2006/07 season, only the second cup of their history. In the 2017 Challenge Cup, Myton made the third round for the first time, losing to Doncaster.

== Honours ==
- Yorkshire Senior Division One champions – 2005/06
- Yorkshire Senior Premier Division Runners-up – 2006/07
- Yorkshire Cup Winners – 2006/07
