= West Bowling A.R.L.F.C. =

English amateur rugby league club

West Bowling
Club information
- Full name: West Bowling; Amateur Rugby League Football Club
- Colours: Green and Red
- Founded: 1950

Current details
- Ground: Horsfall Stadium (3,500)
- Coach: Liam Coe & Elliott Cousins
- Competition: NCRL National Premier League

West Bowling are an amateur rugby league club in Bradford, Yorkshire, England, which competes in the NCRL National Premier League and play home games at Horsfall Stadium.

The club runs teams from U5s (Nippers) up to open age, with the second team competing in the Yorkshire Men's League.

Former West Bowling players who have played at international level include Leon Pryce, Stuart Reardon and Elliot Whitehead. BARLA representatives include Steven Illingworth, Lee Innes and Nigel Halmshaw. Other representative or honours include Gareth Shephard for Lancashire.

In recent times players such as Ethan Ryan, Elliot Minchella, Daniel Halmshaw, Jake Trueman, Matty Storton, Rowan Milnes, Lewis Reed, Harry Williams & Joe Lumb have gone on to represent Bradford Bulls, Hunslet R.L.F.C. & Keighley Cougars respectively.

== History ==
West Bowling were founded in 1950 and played in the local Bradford League until 1975 after the formation of the British Amateur Rugby League Association and entered the newly formed Pennine League.

The club moved to Bankhouse Cricket Club in 1997 and entered the National Conference League in 1999.

Following the National Conference League's switch to summer, Bowling could no longer play at Bankhouse Cricket Club and had to resign from the league. The club moved to Emsley Rec playing fields with its headquarters being Cue Gardens at Odsal.

The club entered the Pennine League in 2013 then switched back to summer to play in the Yorkshire Men's League in 2016. The following season Bowling were accepted back into the National Conference League.
