= Blackbrook A.R.L.F.C. =

English amateur rugby league club, based in St Helens, Merseyside

Blackbrook

Club information
- Full name: Blackbrook Amateur and Junior Rugby League Football Club
- Nickname(s): Brook, Royals
- Colours: Black and white (Youth and Open Age); Royal and navy blue (Royals)
- Founded: 1952; 74 years ago
- Website: Official Club Website

Current details
- Ground: Blackbrook Rugby and Recreational Club (Youth and Open Age) Sutton Brook Greenway Playing Fields (Royals)
- Competition: National Conference League Division One

Blackbrook Amateur and Junior Rugby League Football Club are an amateur rugby league club based at Blackbrook Sports and Recreational Club in Boardmans Lane, Blackbrook, St. Helens, Merseyside. The first team plays in the National Conference League 3rd Division, whilst the junior section of the club; the Royals, play in the North West Counties Junior Rugby Leagues for ages 12 and up. The club form the basis of the careers of many St Helens R.F.C., Warrington Wolves, Wigan Warriors and in recent years especially, Salford City Reds players, thanks to their highly successful reputation at all ages through to Open Age rugby.

== History ==
=== Early years ===
The club was founded in 1952, and played in the North West Counties League. In the early stages of Blackbrook's existence, they were almost exclusively and adults club, with only a handful of teens playing at the club, and even then, they were classed part of one of the open age teams. That was, however, until 1975, when a group of parents got together to form an exclusive youth and junior section of the club.

=== Formation of the Royals ===
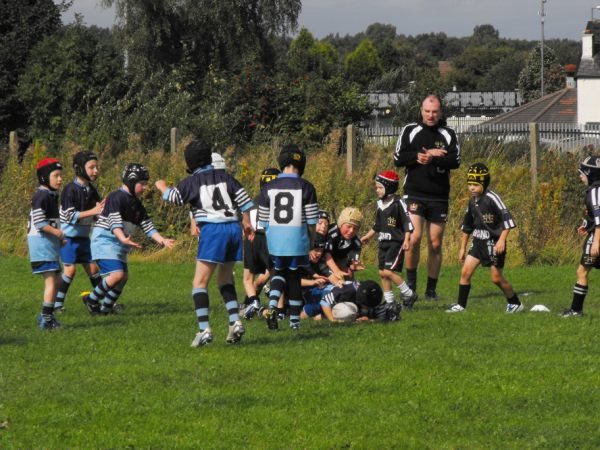
A 2010 under-10 game.

In 1975, a group of parents got together with the idea of forming a section of the club that was open to children and youths individually. The main idea was to provide something for children to do once school had finished, via the medium of sport; specifically, rugby league. Initially, the age groups were mixed, but gradually, the club has seen 11 age groups form, from ages 6–18. Success has come to the club since the formation of the Royals, with many age groups enjoying success through the regional leagues and cups (both the Lancashire Junior and North West Counties Cups) as well as the National Youth Cup. There are now around 200 youngsters playing at the club. However, perhaps a greater pride taken by the club is the number of youths who go on to play professionally. Notable examples of players who turned professional with St Helens via the club include Man of Steel Award winners Paul Wellens, James Roby and James Graham and Paul Clough. Also, many of the names in St Helens' Academy sides are Blackbrook juniors. Perhaps the prime example of a player who signed for Warrington from the club is Brian Case, whilst Kevin Brown signed for Wigan from the Royals. Additionally, the club prides itself on allowing children to play the game under its registered coaches regardless of ability or disability, race and background.

=== After 1975 ===
The junior side of the club that was formed in 1975 become separate from the funding side of the club, tending not to seek money from the club itself. The 1st team recently had a run in the National Conference League, but were unsuccessful and returned to the regional competition. The Open Age team won consecutive Lancashire County Cups in 2006 and 2007, but were, in 2009, relegated to Division One of the North West Counties pyramid. Promotion was gained at the first attempt however, and the club began 2011 in the Premier Division. They won back-to-back North West championships in 2011–12; firstly winning the last official winter Premiership, and then finishing top of the inaugural North West Men's League in 2012 – losing only the one game. As such, the club successfully applied to play in the NCL Third Division in 2013, as part of a nine-team expansion of the top layer of the amateur pyramid. In 2016, Blackbrook secured promotion from NCL Division Two, but withdrew from Division One the following season. In the 2018 season, they were readmitted into Division Three, but played only one fixture before withdrawing from the National League Conference.

== Honours ==
- BARLA Lancashire Cup
  - Winners (3): 1986–87, 2005–06, 2006–07
