= Wigan St Judes =

English amateur rugby league club

Club information
- Full name: Wigan St Judes; Amateur Rugby League Football Club
- Colours: Maroon and yellow
- Founded: 1980; 46 years ago

Current details
- Ground: Keats Avenue, Parsons Meadow, Poolstock, Wigan, WN3 5UB
- Competition: NCRL National Premier League

Wigan St Judes are an amateur rugby league football club from Wigan, Greater Manchester. The club currently competes in the NCRL National Premier League. The club also operates a number of academy teams.

== History ==
Wigan St Judes were formed in 1980 and began with just 20 child aged players. The club now has some 300 players from age 7 through to adults. Six youth teams play in the National Youth League. In 1991, the club moved to its present location in the Poolstock area of Wigan and operates three pitches and a clubhouse. The club also acts as one of the official feeder clubs for Wigan Warriors, the town's professional Super League club.

St Judes initially played in the North West Counties League and progressed to the Premier Division where they played for three seasons before applying for the National Conference League.

Players from the club to turn professional include; Kris Radlinski, Mick Cassidy, Sean Long, Gareth Hock, Craig Makin, Wes Davies, Mark Smith, Paul Prescott, Jack Hughes, Liam Bent, Tommy Makinson, Junior Nsemba and Harvey Makin

On 10 April 2015, the club and the Wigan community mourned the loss of 14-year-old promising St Judes youth player Miracle Godson, who drowned in the Appley Bridge quarry.

== Honours ==
- National Conference League Division One
  - Winners (1): 2007–08
