= Leigh East A.R.L.F.C. =

English amateur rugby league club

Leigh East ARLFC

Club information
- Full name: Leigh East ARLFC
- Colours: Red and Black
- Founded: 1977; 49 years ago

Current details
- Ground: Leigh Sports Village, Ledgard Avenue, Leigh, Lancs, WN7 4GY
- Competition: NCL Division Three

Leigh East ARLFC is an amateur rugby league team from Leigh, a town within the Metropolitan Borough of Wigan, in Greater Manchester, England. They play in the National Conference League. They play their home matches at Leigh Sports Village, Ledgard Avenue and their playing colours are red and black. The club was formed in 1977 by Geoff Owen, Jim Hoffman, John Latham and Alan Prescott.

Junior rugby was always a target for East and was put into action in 1982 when u19s and u17s teams were formed. In 1989 Leigh East took over Leigh Juniors which enabled them to run teams at every age group from u7s to open age and are consistently among the top sides in Lancashire. In 1979 after campaigning the land at the side of Hilton Park became available on Grasmere St, The clubhouse was started in 1982 and officially opened in 1984.

The senior outfit's finest times have come since joining the National League.

East joined in the days of two divisions and were promoted into the top division at the first attempt as runners up to Saddleworth. The following season, they, won the First Division Championship and the Lancashire Cup, defeated Bradford Northern before losing 24-12 in the Challenge Cup and then beat Chorley Borough in the Regal Trophy to join the elite band of amateur clubs to have defeated professional opposition.

Inevitably, East lost several key members of this team to professional clubs and as other players retired from the game the side became weakened and lost some of its momentum.

Under the strong leadership of Steve Grimshaw and David Kay East re-built and finally battled their way out of the Conference First Division - to gain promotion into the elite Premier Division as Champions.

== Honours ==
Club honours include:

- European Club Championship: Winners 2010–11
- National Cup: Runners Up 2009–10
- National Conference League Premier Division: Champions 2009–10
- National League First Division: Champions 1990–91 and 2000–01
- National League Second Division: Runners Up 1989–90
- Lancashire Cup: Winners; 1990–91. Runners Up 1988–89
- Champions Challenge: Winners 1990, 1991, 1999, 2000, 2002. Runners Up 2001
- North West Counties Division 1: Runners Up 1979–80 and 1982–83
