= Egremont Rangers =

English amateur rugby league club, based in Egremont, Cumbria

Club information
- Full name: Egremont Rangers Amateur Rugby League Football Club
- Nickname: The Mont
- Colours: Blue; White; Red trim
- Founded: 1900; 126 years ago
- Website: Club Website

Current details
- Ground: Gillfoot Park, North Road, Egremont CA22 2PR
- Coach: Danny Barker
- Competition: National Conference League Division 1

Egremont Rangers is an amateur rugby league club in Egremont, Cumbria, which plays at Gillfoot Park and competes in the National Conference League Division 1.

== Former players ==
• Garry Purdham

• Rob Purdham

== Challenge Cup history ==
Egremont Rangers first formed in 1900 as the popularity of Northern Union rugby spread across northern England after its split with the Rugby Football Union. Egremont had a strong team early in its history as it twice qualified for the Challenge Cup in 1906 where they were defeated by Keighley and in 1909 when they were defeated by Runcorn RFC. This was a sound foundation for the club to build on to become a major player in amateur rugby league in Great Britain. In 1922 they added the Rangers moniker to their name just as the Northern Rugby Football Union changed their name to Rugby Football League.

The modern era of rugby league was when Rangers were able to again qualify for professional opposition in the Challenge Cup when on 14 January 1996 they were defeated 58-6 by Leigh Centurions. It wasn't long before they had a taste of the cup again when on 13 February 1998 they beat Workington Town 18-0 in front of 3000 spectators at Whitehaven's Recreation Ground. The next round saw them being heavily defeated 84-6 by the eventual Challenge Cup Champions, Sheffield Eagles.

1999 was Rangers next attempt at the Challenge Cup when they were defeated by York Wasps. It was 2011 before they would have a chance to play another professional team, after dispatching local rivals Millom and Wath Brow in the earlier rounds, the travelled south to be defeated 60-24 by London Skolars. 2012 and again Rangers qualified for professional opposition when they took on and were narrowly defeated 22-14 by Championship One side Oldham at the Recreation Ground, Whitehven. Egremont were praised for their magnificent defensive performance in the News and Star.

== National Conference League ==
Egremont Rangers were one of the ten teams that formed the BARLA National League (later renamed National Conference League in 1993) which began in the 1986–1987 season. Rangers remained in the top tier of the National Conference League (National Conference League Premier Division) from 1986–2000, where they gained one of their greatest achievements when they were crowned National Conference League Premier Division Champions in the 1997–1998 season.

This period saw Rangers achieve two more major championships. In the 1988–1989 season, Egremont beat Wigan St Patricks 2-0 in the National Conference League Challenge Cup Final. A year later they captured the BARLA National Cup when they beat Saddleworth Rangers 11-4 in the 1989–1990 final.

== Return to the Cumberland League ==
In the 1999–2000 season, Egremont's ageing core of veteran players voted to withdraw from the National Conference League and return to play their senior rugby in the Cumberland League for the first time in 14 years. This period saw many of the older players retire from the game, leaving mostly younger players to rebuild the squad over the coming years. The team played their rugby in the Cumberland League Division 1 and remained competitive although they failed to convert that into trophy success. Rangers twice made it to the Cumbria County Cup Final but were defeated on both occasions by Wath Brow (32-6 in 2000–2001) and Ellenborough Rangers (16-10 in 2004–2005). Rangers also made it to the play off final of the Cumberland League Division 1 in the 2004–2005 season but were again defeated 52-10 on the day by Kells. Under the guidance of their head coach (and former Workington Town captain) Gary Charlton and Club Chairman (former Workington Town second-row) Ian Hartley in the 2004–2005 season the young players voted for and successfully applied for the return to the National Conference League for the 2005–2006 season.

== Return to the National Conference League ==
In the late summer of 2005 Egremont Rangers returned to the National Conference League when they competed in Division 2. They young side got off to an unimpressive start and for the first three seasons they finished in the lower half to mid table positions. It wasn't until 2009–2010 season that they started to seriously compete in the Second Division as a new generation of youngster entered the ranks of the first team. The 2010–2011 season proved to be when Rangers matured into a team that could seriously challenge for promotion, in which they finished narrow runners up to Hunslet Warriors and gained promotion to the National Conference League Division 1.

== Youth and reserve teams ==
Egremont Rangers have a reserve team which plays in the Cumberland League Division 2 as Egremont Rangers 'A'. The main purpose for this team is to develop youth players in their transition from youth rugby to national level open age rugby league. The team is mostly made up by teenage players built around a nucleus of seasoned veterans.

Egremont Rangers has a competitive youth system with teams in Mini rugby (under 8s, under 9s and under 11s) and youth teams (under 12s, under 14s and under 16s). The youth system at Egremont Rangers is the basis of Rangers open age squad. Almost all of the players in the open age squad have played at the club from the under 8s/9s/11s youth teams and every year a new batch of players emerges from under 16s with many of them gaining international honours in the years following their emergence into open age rugby.

== Honours ==
- National Conference League Premier Division
  - Winners (1): 1997–98
- National Conference League Division One
  - Winners (1): 2012
- BARLA National Cup
  - Winners (2): 1989–90, 2015

== International honours ==
Since 2008 Egremont Rangers have had 10 players which have amassed over 25 separate international honours between them. Here is a list of players and their honours.

- John-Paul Brocklebank - BARLA Open Age Dubai 9's and Australia Tour, BARLA U21 Russia Tour, BARLA U18's Australia Tour
- Rhys Davies - BARLA Open Age Dubai 9's and Australia Tour, BARLA U23
- Alistair Leak - England Schoolboys South Africa Tour, England U18 France, Australia & Wales. GB U18 France
- Blake Mahovic - England Schoolboys South Africa Tour, England U18 France & Australia
- Leon Crellin - BARLA U17's Holland Tour
- Stephen Long - BARLA Over 35's Dubai 9's
- James McDonald - England U18 Community Lions, Australia, England U16 Schoolboys, France
- Jack Murray - BARLA U19 South Africa Tour
- Jarrad Stewart - England U16 Schoolboys, France
- Richard Farrer - BARLA Open Age

Jack Thompson England lions under 19s
