= Rochdale Mayfield =

English amateur rugby league club

Club information
- Full name: Rochdale Mayfield; Amateur Rugby League Football Club
- Colours: Blue & white
- Founded: 1958; 68 years ago

Current details
- Ground: Mayfield Sports Centre, Castleton, Rochdale, Greater Manchester
- Coach: Andy Reid, Tui Lolohea
- Competition: NCRL National Premier League

Rochdale Mayfield are an amateur rugby league football club from Castleton, Greater Manchester, England. The club currently competes in the NCRL National Premier League. The club also operates academy teams who are known collectively as Rochdale Mayfield Mustangs.

== History ==
Mayfield ARLFC were formed in 1958. The club's name came from the Mayfield Hotel in Rochdale where they were originally based.

After a number of years, the club moved to the Old Bridge Inn, and played at Balderstone Park and Springhill. The club notably played Challenge Cup games against Salford, Hunslet and Rochdale Hornets (February 2016).

Mayfield again moved to a new venue when they entered into a ground share deal with the Castleton Moor Cricket Club, and entered the National Conference League. The club has developed players for Rochdale Hornets and other local semi-professional sides.

The now named Rochdale Mayfield again moved in 2006. This time to the Mayfield Sports Centre, Castleton, the club's current home.

In August 2020 Rochdale Mayfield incorporated the youth emblem of a mustang into their crest.

England internationals Matty Ashton and Matty Lees both began their rugby league careers playing at junior level for Rochdale Mayfield.

== Honours ==
- NCL Division One
  - Winners (2): 1992–93, 2006–07
- Conference Challenge Trophy
  - Winners (1): 2016
- BARLA Lancashire Cup
  - Winners (1): 1974–75
