= Ince Rose Bridge =

English amateur rugby league club

Club information
- Full name: Ince Rose Bridge; Amateur Rugby League Football Club
- Colours: Red and Black

Current details
- Ground: Pinfold Street, Ince, Wigan, Greater Manchester. WN2 2DZ
- Competition: National Community Rugby League

Ince Rose Bridge are an amateur rugby league football club based in Ince-in-Makerfield, Greater Manchester. The club's first team plays in the National Community Rugby League.
