= Heworth A.R.L.F.C. =

English amateur rugby league club

Heworth

Club information
- Full name: Heworth; Amateur Rugby League Football Club
- Colours: Black
- Founded: 1922; 104 years ago
- Website: Official Club Website

Current details
- Ground: Elmpark Way
- Competition: NCRL National Premier League

Heworth A.R.L.F.C. is an amateur rugby league football club based in Heworth, York. The first team plays in the NCRL National Premier League.

In 1986, the club was one of ten founder members of the BARLA National Amateur League (later known as the National Conference League), and were the winners of the inaugural 1986–87 season.

Heworth has produced many players who went on to play the game professionally, most notably former internationals Ray Batten, Ken Bowman, Gary Divorty, Bill and Jim Drake, Colin Forsyth, David Watkinson and Geoff Wriglesworth.

The club went into decline following their success in the early years of the league, and in 2012 were demoted to NCL Division Three after failing to fulfill one of their fixtures. In 2015, the club withdrew from the National Conference League altogether due to a lack of playing strength. The club returned to the National Conference League in 2019. In 2022, Heworth were NCL Division Two champions. In 2023, Heworth won the Division One Promotion decider against Oulton Raiders to earn a place in the Premier Division.

== Elmpark Way ==
Heworth moved to Elmpark way in 1970. The site is located beside Monk Stray and is also home to Heworth Cricket Club and the City of York Hockey club. In the 2000s, the ground hosted the York International 9s tournament. In 2015, it became the temporary home of York City Knights between their departure from Huntington Stadium and their ground share with York City F.C. at Bootham Crescent. In 2017, Elmpark Way was the venue for the final of the Women's Challenge Cup

== Honours ==
- National Conference League Premier Division
  - Winners (1): 1986–87
- National Conference League Division One
  - Winners (1): 1993–94
- National Conference League Division Two
  - Winners (1): 2022
- BARLA Yorkshire Cup
  - Winners (1): 1993–94
