= Oulton Raiders =

English amateur rugby league club, based in Leeds

Club information
- Full name: Oulton Raiders; Amateur Rugby League Football Club
- Nickname(s): Raiders, The Wind Turbines
- Colours: Blue & Yellow
- Founded: 1962; 64 years ago

Current details
- Ground: Oulton Sports, also known as Raiders Park Pavilion, Oulton Green, Leeds
- CEO: Philip Craddick
- Coach: Sonny Gill
- Competition: NCL Division One

Oulton Raiders are an amateur rugby league football club from Oulton in Leeds, West Yorkshire. The club's open age team currently compete in division one of the National Conference League. The club also operates many youth teams.

The club was founded in 1962 as Oulton Miners Welfare, and has produced a number of players who went on to play professional rugby league, including, Ryan Hall, Ryan Hudson and Kelvin Skerrett.

== See also ==
- Oulton Raidettes
