= Salford City Roosters =

English amateur rugby league club

Club information
- Full name: Salford City Roosters; Amateur Rugby League Football Club
- Nickname: Roosters
- Colours: Navy, red & white hoops
- Founded: 1977; 49 years ago

Current details
- Ground: Moat Hall Sports Centre, Eccles, Salford, Greater Manchester
- Competition: North West Men's League

Salford City Roosters are an amateur rugby league football club from Eccles in the City of Salford, Greater Manchester. The club currently competes in the North West Men's League. The club also operates a number of Junior teams.

== History ==
Salford City Roosters traces its roots back to 1977 when it began as G.E.C in the NWCL. Despite humble beginnings, the club emerged as the most successful in Manchester & District League history.

The early years saw G.E.C struggle, finishing at the bottom of Division 3 in their inaugural season and repeating a wooden spoon place the following year. However, determination prevailed, leading to a mid-table finish in Division 4. The club's popularity surged, prompting the formation of an 'A' team in Division 4. Concurrently, the first team secured promotion back into Division 3.

In a transformative moment, Rod & Alfrieda Kindon, alongside a dedicated committee, discovered a derelict open-air school in Eccles. Through hard work and volunteer efforts, this site became the former clubhouse, marking a turning point as the club was renamed Eccles ARLFC.

The 1980–81 season proved historic as Eccles went undefeated to claim their first league title. Notably, winger Steve Evans became the first Eccles player to turn professional. Over 40 players, including notable names such as Ian Watson, Nathan McAvoy, and Adrian Morley, progressed to elite level rugby and coaching.

Eccles experienced steady progress, reaching the Premier Division in 1988. Despite a brief relegation, they swiftly returned and even produced a top-class under 18’s team that secured the club's first County title, the Lancashire Cup, in 1993–94. Individual honors, such as Alfrieda Kindon's 10-year service award and NWCL Secretary of the Year award, further highlighted the club's success.

Acceptance into the Conference Division 2 for the 1994–95 season marked another milestone, and Eccles stayed in Division 2 until gaining promotion in 1998–99. The Conference league era witnessed further improvements to the Club facilities, including the enclosure of pitches and clubhouse, spectator barriers, floodlights, and additional facilities.

The club's achievements extended beyond the pitch. Alfrieda Kindon was awarded the prestigious "Silver Boot Award," and the NWCL team made history by winning the NW Juniors.

Eccles became Eccles Roosters upon a link up with Australian National Rugby League club Sydney Roosters and Adrian Morley

In October 2014, a rebranding initiative led to the club becoming Salford City Roosters. The name change aimed to maintain identity, with all youth and junior teams referred to as "Junior Roosters".

The club previously competed in the National Conference League, but withdrew their membership from the league in 2019.
