= East Hull A.R.L.F.C. =

East Hull

Club information
- Full name: East Hull Amateur Rugby League Football Club
- Colours: blue and white (home) red and white (away)

Current details
- Ground(s): Rosmead Sports Centre
- Competition: Yorkshire Men's League

East Hull A.R.L.F.C. is an amateur rugby league team from Kingston upon Hull. They play their home matches at Rosmead Sports Centre, Hull and currently compete in the Yorkshire Men's League. The team's strip colours are blue and white and the away colours are red and white. The coaches comprise Lee Radford, John McCracken and Josh Hodgson.

The club was previously known as Mysons, but changed their name to East Hull in 1996.

The club defeated professional opposition in the 2004 Challenge Cup with a 26–14 victory in their third round tie against Swinton Lions.

The club previously competed in the National Conference League, but withdrew in 2014 due to a shortage of players and funding.

East Hull run many junior teams and these play home matches at St Richards Primary School on Marfleet Lane in Hull.

== Honours ==
- National Conference League Premier Division
  - Winners (1): 2007–08
- National Conference League Division Two
  - Winners (1): 2003–04
- BARLA National Cup
  - Winners (3): 1985–86, 2007–08
- BARLA Yorkshire Cup
  - Winners (3): 1983–84, 2002–03, 2006–07
