= Skirlaugh A.R.L.F.C. =

English amateur rugby league club

Skirlaugh

Club information
- Full name: Skirlaugh; Amateur Rugby League Football Club
- Colours: Black, Gold & White
- Founded: 1980; 46 years ago

Current details
- Ground: Eastside Community Sports & Social Club, Staithes Road, Saltend Hedon, Hull
- Competition: NCL Division Two

Skirlaugh A.R.L.F.C. are an amateur rugby league football club based in Salt End, East Riding of Yorkshire, England. The club's first team plays in the National Conference League.

== Honours ==
- National Conference League Premier Division
  - Winners (1): 2006–07
- National Conference League Division One
  - Winners (1): 1997–98
- BARLA National Cup
  - Winners (4): 1995–96, 1998–99, 1999–2000, 2005–06
