= 2026 Wigan Warriors Women season =

Wigan Warriors Women 2026 season
- 2026 Women's Challenge Cup champions
- Super League Rank: 1st
- Challenge Cup: Champions
- 2026 record: Wins: 12; draws: 0; losses: 0
- Points scored: For: 350; against: 82

Team information
- CEO: Kris Radlinski
- Head Coach: Denis Betts
- Captain: Georgia Wilson
- Stadium: Edge Hall Road

Top scorers
- Tries: Anna Davies; Eva Hunter (13 each)
- Goals: Isabel Rowe (26)
- Points: Isabel Rowe (64)
| Home colours | Away colours |
| ← 2025 | List of seasons | 2027 → |

The 2026 season is the Wigan Warriors Women's 9th consecutive season in the top flight of British women's rugby league. The club are competing in the 2026 RFL Women's Super League, the 2026 Women's Challenge Cup, and the 2026 RFL Women's Nines tournament.

The team is captained by Georgia Wilson, after Vicky Molyneux's retirement, with head coach Denis Betts taking charge of the team for his third season.

The 2026 season comes off the back of Wigan's quadruple-winning 2025 season, where the team won the 2025 Challenge Cup, the League Leaders' Shield, the 2025 Super League Grand Final, and the RFL Women's Nines.

== Super League ==
On the 26 January 2026, the RFL announced that the Women's Super League format would be changed for the upcoming season. Each team would face each other once, home or away, in a single round of fixtures, with the top and bottom four teams then facing each other home and away in an extended Play-Off series. The team in first at the end of these fixtures would be crowned League Leaders, and earn a place in the Grand Final, whilst the second and third place teams would face off for the final spot in the match.

Wigan's fixtures were announced on 26 January 2026, with their first match against Leeds Rhinos on Saturday 16 May, at Edge Hall Road Community Stadium.

=== Regular season ===
==== Fixtures ====
| Date and time | Round | Versus | H/A | Venue | Result | Score | Tries | Goals | Attendance | TV | Pos. | Report |
|---|---|---|---|---|---|---|---|---|---|---|---|---|
| 16 May; 14:00 | Round 1 | Leeds Rhinos | H | Edge Hall Road | W | 18–10 | C.Jones, Davies, E.Hunter, Derbyshire | Rowe (1/4) | Unknown | Not televised | 4th | |
| 24 May; 13:00 | Round 2 | Barrow Raiders | A | Craven Park | W | 74–6 | Davies (4), Derbyshire (2), Foubister, Banks, E.Hunter (3), Rowe, Dainton, R.Hunter | Rowe (0/3), Foubister (5/6), Wilson (4/5) | Unknown | Not televised | 1st | |
| 4 June; 19:00 | Round 3 | Leigh Leopards | H | Edge Hall Road | W | 68–4 | E.Hunter (2), Rowe, Salihi, R.Hunter, Davies, Foubister, C.Jones (3), Banks, Wilton, Llewellyn-Sharrock | Rowe (6/8), Foubister (2/5) | Unknown | Not televised | 1st | |
| 14 June; 14:00 | Round 4 | Huddersfield Giants | A | Laund Hill | W | 56–12 | Davies (2), Williams (2), Foubister, Dainton, Atherton (2), Banks, Coleman | Foubister (8/10) | Unknown | Not televised | 1st | |
| 20 June; 12:00 | Round 5 | York Valkyrie | A | York Community Stadium | W | 32–12 | E. Hunter (2), Derbyshire, Sams, Banks (2) | Rowe (4/6) | Unknown | Not televised | 1st | |
| 27 June; 13:00 | Round 6 | St Helens | H | Edge Hall Road | W | 32–28 | E.Hunter (2), Davies (2), Rowe, Coleman | Rowe (4/6) | Unknown | Not televised | 1st | |
| 11 July; 14:00 | Round 7 | Featherstone Rovers | H | Edge Hall Road | W | 70–10 | Hunter (2), Davies (3), Banks, Salihi, Derbyshire, Jones, Llewellyn-Sharrock, Wilson, Wilton | Rowe (11/12) | Unknown | Not televised | 1st | |

==== Table ====
| Pos | Team | Pld | W | D | L | PF | PA | PD | Pts | Qualification (Note: should teams have the same points difference, then position is decided by points scored percentage (points scored, divided by points conceded, multiplied by 100).) |
|---|---|---|---|---|---|---|---|---|---|---|
| 1 | Wigan Warriors | 7 | 7 | 0 | 0 | 350 | 82 | +268 | 14 | Advance to Super 4s |
| 2 | Leeds Rhinos | 7 | 6 | 0 | 1 | 302 | 62 | +240 | 12 | Advance to Super 4s |
| 3 | St Helens | 7 | 5 | 0 | 2 | 232 | 106 | +126 | 10 | Advance to Super 4s |
| 4 | York Valkyrie | 7 | 4 | 0 | 3 | 208 | 92 | +116 | 8 | Advance to Super 4s |
| 5 | Huddersfield Giants | 7 | 3 | 0 | 4 | 136 | 210 | −74 | 6 | Consigned to Shield |
| 6 | Leigh Leopards | 7 | 2 | 0 | 5 | 64 | 292 | −228 | 4 | Consigned to Shield |
| 7 | Featherstone Rovers | 7 | 1 | 0 | 6 | 44 | 302 | −258 | 2 | Consigned to Shield |
| 8 | Barrow Raiders | 7 | 0 | 0 | 7 | 82 | 272 | −190 | 0 | Consigned to Shield |

Source: Sky Sports
Rules for classification: 1) competition points 2) points difference (points scored minus points conceded) 3) points scored percentage (points scored divided by points conceded, multiplied by 100).

=== Super 4s ===
==== Fixtures ====
| Date and time | Round | Versus | H/A | Venue | Result | Score | Tries | Goals | Attendance | TV | Pos. | Report |
|---|---|---|---|---|---|---|---|---|---|---|---|---|
| 6 August; 17:15 | Round 1 | St Helens | A | Langtree Park | W | 44–6 | Derbyshire (2), Hunter (2), Davies, M.Jones, Wilton, Foubister, Coleman | Rowe (4/9) | | Sky Sports Action | 1st | |
| 15 August; 12:00 | Round 2 | York Valkyrie | H | Edge Hall Road | W | 44–0 | Williams, Foubister, M.Jones (2), Gentles, Derbyshire, Hunter (2) | Rowe (6/8) | | Not televised | 1st | |
| 22 August; 14:00 | Round 3 | St Helens | H | Robin Park Arena | W | 56–4 | Williams, Wilson, Jones (2), Derbyshire, Banks (2), Hunter, Foubister, Davies, Salih | Rowe (6/11) | | Not televised | 1st | |
| 29 August; 14:00 | Round 4 | Leeds Rhinos | H | Edge Hall Road | W | 26–20 | Coleman (2), Jones, Sams, Hunter | Rowe (3/5) | | Not televised | 1st | |
| 5 September; 17:15 | Round 5 | Leeds Rhinos | A | Headingley Rugby Stadium | W | 50–12 | Willams (2), R.Hunter, Coleman, Davies (2), Derbyshire, E.Hunter, Rowe | Rowe (7/9) | | Sky Sports+ | 1st | |
| 13 September; 12:00 | Round 6 | York Valkyrie | A | York Community Stadium | L | 12–26 | Coleman, Gentles | Rowe (2/2) | | Not televised | 1st | |

==== Table ====
| Pos | Team | Pld | W | D | L | PF | PA | PD | Pts | Qualification (Note: should teams have the same points difference, then position is decided by points scored percentage (points scored, divided by points conceded, multiplied by 100).) |
|---|---|---|---|---|---|---|---|---|---|---|
| 1 | Wigan Warriors (Q, L) | 13 | 12 | 0 | 1 | 582 | 150 | +432 | 24 | League Leaders' Shield and advance to Grand Final |
| 2 | Leeds Rhinos (Q) | 13 | 8 | 0 | 5 | 442 | 220 | +222 | 16 | Advance to semi-final |
| 3 | York Valkyrie (Q) | 13 | 7 | 0 | 6 | 306 | 228 | +78 | 14 | Advance to semi-final |
| 4 | St Helens | 13 | 7 | 0 | 6 | 332 | 300 | +32 | 14 | |

Source: Sky Sports
Rules for classification: 1) competition points 2) points difference (points scored minus points conceded) 3) points scored percentage (points scored divided by points conceded, multiplied by 100).
(L) League Leaders' Shield Winners; (Q) Qualified for the phase indicated

=== Playoffs ===
| Date and time | Round | Versus | H/A | Venue | Result | Score | Tries | Goals | Attendance | TV | Report |
|---|---|---|---|---|---|---|---|---|---|---|---|
| 27 September; 17:30 | Grand Final | York Valkyrie | H | Brick Community Stadium | L | 6–8 | Atherton | Rowe (1/1) | | Sky Sports+ | |

== Challenge Cup ==
The draw for the 2026 Women's Challenge Cup meant that three teams would compete in a single round robin, with matches played over three consecutive weekends in April 2026, with the group winner and runners-up advancing to the knockout rounds.

Wigan were drawn in Group C, alongside Featherstone Rovers and Cardiff Demons, with the matches set to take place on 4 April and 11 April.

After progressing from the group stage, Wigan were drawn to face London Broncos at Edge Hall Road on 25 April 2026. After a club-record 112-0 victory over London Broncos, Wigan were drawn against York Valkyrie in the semi-finals, with the match set to take place on 9 May 2026 at the Halliwell Jones Stadium in Warrington.

| Date and time | Round | Versus | H/A | Venue | Result | Score | Tries | Goals | Attendance | TV | Report |
|---|---|---|---|---|---|---|---|---|---|---|---|
| 1 April; 13:00 | Group Stage 1 | Featherstone Rovers | A | Post Office Road | W | 78–6 | Wilson (2),Rowe (3), Davies (3), Sams (2), C. Jones (2), Derbyshire, Hunter, Dainton | Rowe (9/14), Foubister (0/1) | Unknown | Not televised | |
| 11 April; 14:00 | Group Stage 2 | Cardiff Demons | H | Edge Hall Road | W | 76–6 | Dainton (2), Derbyshire (2), Davies, Williams, Sams, Rowe, M. Jones, Foubister, Wilson, Atherton | Rowe (12/13) | Unknown | Not televised | |
| 25 April; 14:00 | Quarter-finals | London Broncos | H | Edge Hall Road | W | 112–0 | M. Jones (2), Dainton (3), Derbyshire (2), Wilson, Banks, Rowe (2), Gentles (2), C. Jones, Williams (2), Marsh, Foubister, Padgett | Rowe (18/19) | Unknown | Not televised | |
| 9 May; 11:30 | Semi-finals | York Valkyrie | N | Halliwell Jones Stadium | W | 52–0 | Derbyshire (2), Coleman (2), Foubister, R. Hunter, Rowe, Davies (2) | Rowe (8/9) | Non recorded | BBC Red Button | |
| 30 May; 11:45 | Final | St Helens | N | Wembley Stadium | W | 54–6 | Wilson, E. Hunter (4) Salihi, Davies (2), Banks, Wilton | Rowe (7/10) | Non recorded | BBC Two | |

== Nines ==
Wigan lost out on defending their RFL Women's Nines title, finding themselves in the second tier shield division which they won beating York Valkyrie 12-8 in the final.

== Transfers ==
=== Transfers in ===
| No | Player | From | Date | Ref. |
|---|---|---|---|---|
| 17 | (England) Kelsey Gentles | Huddersfield Giants | 17 November 2025 | |
| 15 | (Wales) Bethan Dainton | Leeds Rhinos | 18 November 2025 | |
| 16 | (England) Beri Salihi | St Helens | 21 November 2025 | |

=== Transfers out ===
| No | Player | To | Date | Ref. |
|---|---|---|---|---|
| 12 | (England) Vicky Molyneux | Retired | 5 October 2025 | |
| 20 | (England) Holly Speakman | Retired | 25 February 2026 | |

== Squad ==
2026 Wigan Warriors Women Squad
| First team squad | | Coaching staff |
|---|---|---|
| (England) 1 Grace Banks – FB; (England) 2 Anna Davies – WG; (England) 3 Georgia Wilson (c) – CE, FB, WG; (England) 4 Molly Jones – CE; (England) 5 Ellise Derbyshire – WG; (England) 6 Jenna Foubister – SO; (England) 7 Isabel Rowe (gk) – SH, SO; (England) 8 Mary Coleman – PR; (Wales) 9 Carys Marsh – HK; (England) 10 Mia-Jayne Atherton – PR; (England) 11 Eva Hunter – SR; (England) 12 Cerys Jones – SR; (England) 13 Megan Williams – LF | (England) 14 Rachel Thompson – LF, CE; (Wales) 15 Bethan Dainton – LF; (England) 16 Beri Salihi – FB; (England) 17 Kelsey Gentles – WG; (Australia) 19 Remi Wilton – HK; (England) 20 Lucie Sams – LF; (England) 21 Jade Gregory-Haselden – PR; (England) 22 Ruby Hunter – WG; (England) 23 Charlotte Meredith – SH; (England) 25 Caitlin Padgett – WG | Head coach: (England) Denis Betts; Legend: (c) Captain(s); (vc) Vice-captain(s); (gk) = Goal kicker; Updated: 20 April 2026; Source(s): 2026 Squad Numbers |

== See also ==
- 2026 Wigan Warriors Men's season
