= 2025 Wigan Warriors Women season =

Wigan Warriors Women 2025 season
- Women's Super League IX champions 2025 Women's Challenge Cup champions
- Super League Rank: 1st
- Play-off result: Champions
- Challenge Cup: Champions
- 2025 record: Wins: 19; draws: 1; losses: 1

Team information
- CEO: Kris Radlinski
- Head Coach: Denis Betts
- Captain: Vicky Molyneux
- Stadium: Robin Park Arena
Home colours	Away colours	Third colours
← 2024	List of seasons	2026 →

The 2025 season was the Wigan Warriors Women's eighth consecutive season in the top flight of British women's rugby league. The club competed in the 2025 RFL Women's Super League, the 2025 Women's Challenge Cup, and the 2025 RFL Women's Nines tournament.

The team was captained by Vicky Molyneux for her final season at the club, with head coach Denis Betts taking charge of the team for his second season.

The 2025 season saw a quadruple-winning season for the Wigan Warriors, where the team won the Challenge Cup, the League Leaders' Shield, the Super League Grand Final, and the RFL Women's Nines.

== Super League ==
=== Regular season ===
==== Results ====
Date and time	Round	Versus	H/A	Venue	Result	Score	Tries	Goals	Attendance	TV	Pos.	Report
16 May; 17:30	Round 1	York Valkyrie	H	Brick Community Stadium	W	40–6	Jones, Hunter, T Power, Banks (2), Veivers, S Power	Rowe (6)	Unknown	Sky Sports Action	1st	
25 May; 14:00	Round 2	Barrow Raiders	H	Robin Park Arena	W	106–6			Unknown	Not televised	1st	
31 May; 14:00	Round 3	Leeds Rhinos	A	Headingley	W	34–12			Unknown	Not televised	1st	
15 June; 15:00	Round 4	Huddersfield Giants	A	Laund Hill	W	58–0			Unknown	Not televised	1st	
22 June; 14:00	Round 5	Leigh Leopards	H	Robin Park Arena	W	60–6			Unknown	Not televised	1st	
29 June; 14:00	Round 6	St Helens	H	Robin Park Arena	D	22–22			Unknown	Not televised	1st	
13 July; 14:00	Round 7	Huddersfield Giants	H	Robin Park Arena	W	76–0			Unknown	Not televised	1st	
20 July; 12:00	Round 8	Warrington Wolves	A	Victoria Park	W	80–0			Unknown	Not televised	1st	
27 July; 14:00	Round 9	Leeds Rhinos	H	Robin Park Arena	W	30–16			Unknown	Not televised	1st	
17 August; 14:00	Round 10	Leigh Leopards	A	Leigh Sports Village	W	72–0			Unknown	Not televised	1st	
24 August; 13:00	Round 11	York Valkyrie	N	Crow Trees Ground	L	10–32			Unknown	Not televised	2nd	
30 August; 14:00	Round 12	Barrow Raiders	A	Craven Park	W	92–0			Unknown	Not televised	2nd	
5 September; 17:30	Round 13	St Helens	A	Totally Wicked Stadium	W	24–20			Unknown	Sky Sports+	1st	
14 September; 14:00	Round 14	Warrington Wolves	H	Robin Park Arena	W	Wo (48–0)	N/A	N/A	N/A	N/A	1st	

==== Table ====
Pos	Team	Pld	W	D	L	PF	PA	PD	Pts	Qualification or relegation
1	Wigan Warriors (Note: On 5 September, Warrington announced, that they had taken the decision to withdraw from the remainder of the season due to player injuries and availability. The remaining two fixtures against Leigh, and Wigan are awarded as 48–0 wins respectively, and therefore confirms Warrington are officially relegated.) (L, C)	14	12	1	1	752	120	+632	25	Advance to semi-finals
2	St Helens	14	11	2	1	590	112	+478	24	Advance to semi-finals
3	York Valkyrie	14	10	0	4	462	166	+296	20	Advance to semi-finals
4	Leeds Rhinos	14	9	1	4	586	186	+400	19	Advance to semi-finals
5	Huddersfield Giants	14	5	1	8	268	428	−160	11	
6	Leigh Leopards	14	3	1	10	200	482	−282	7	
7	Barrow Raiders	14	3	0	11	132	726	−594	6	
8	Warrington Wolves (R)	14	0	0	14	56	826	−770	−9 (Note: On 29 September 2025, Warrington Wolves were deducted nine points for failing to fulfill four of their games during the 2025 Season.)	Relegation to Championship

Rules for classification: 1) competition points 2) points difference (points scored minus points conceded) 3) points scored percentage (points scored divided by points conceded, multiplied by 100).
(C) Champions; (L) League Leaders' Shield Winners; (R) Relegated

=== Playoffs ===
Date and time	Round	Versus	H/A	Venue	Result	Score	Tries	Goals	Attendance	TV	Report
21 September; 19:30	Semi-finals	Leeds Rhinos	H	Brick Community Stadium	W	38–0	Coleman (2), R. Hunter, E. Hunter (2), Atherton, Power	Rowe (5)	2,108	Sky Sports+	
5 October; 17:30	Grand Final	St Helens	H	Brick Community Stadium	W	16–12	Davies (2), Jones (2)		5,018	Sky Sports+	

== Challenge Cup ==
Date and time	Round	Versus	H/A	Venue	Result	Score	Tries	Goals	Attendance	TV	Report
6 April; 14:00	Group Stage 1	Barrow Raiders	H	Robin Park Arena	W	84–0			Unknown	Not televised	
13 April; 14:00	Group Stage 2	London Broncos	A	Chiswick Rugby Club	W	44–0			Unknown	Not televised	
10 May; 12:00	Semi-finals	Leeds Rhinos	N	York Community Stadium	W	44–14			Unknown	BBC Red Button	
7 June; 11:45	Final	St Helens	N	Wembley Stadium	W	42–6	Williams, Coleman, Veivers, Rowe, Hunter, Banks, Davies	Rowe (7)	8,810	BBC Two	

== Nines ==
Date and time	Round	Versus	H/A	Venue	Result	Score	Tries	Goals	Attendance	TV	Report
5 July	Group Stage	Barrow Raiders	N	West Park Leeds RUFC	W	?–?				Not televised	
5 July	Group Stage	Hull KR	N	West Park Leeds RUFC	W	?–?				Not televised	
5 July	Group Stage	Northumbria University R.L.F.C.	N	West Park Leeds RUFC	W	Wo				Not televised	
5 July	Quarter-finals	St Helens	N	West Park Leeds RUFC	W	31–0				Not televised	
5 July	Semi-finals	Swinton Lionesses	N	West Park Leeds RUFC	W	25–0				Not televised	
5 July	Final	Huddersfield Giants	N	West Park Leeds RUFC	W	12–0				Not televised	

== Squad ==
2025 Wigan Warriors Women's Squad
First team squad		Coaching staff
(England) 1 Grace Banks – FB, SH; (England) 2 Anna Davies – WG, CE; (England) 3 Georgia Wilson – CE, FB; (England) 4 Molly Jones – CE; (England) 5 Ellise Derbyshire – WG; (England) 6 Jenna Foubister – SO, SH; (England) 7 Isabel Rowe – SH, SO; (England) 8 Mary Coleman – PR, SR; (Wales) 9 Carys Marsh – HK; (Australia) 10 Shaniah Power – SR; (England) 11 Eva Hunter – SR; (England) 12 Victoria Molyneux (c) – SR, LF; (England) 13 Megan Williams – LF	(England) 14 Rachel Thompson – PR, LF, CE (vc); (England) 15 Cerys Jones – SR, LF; (Australia) 16 Rease Casey – SR, HK; (Papua New Guinea) 17 Emily Veivers – LF, PR, SR; (Australia) 19 Remi Wilton – HK; (England) 20 Holly Speakman – PR; (England) 21 Jade Gregory-Haselden – PR; (England) 22 Mia-Jayne Atherton – PR, SR; (England) 23 Kaitlin Hilton – CE; (England) 24 Ruby Hunter – SR, CE; (England) 25 Gracie Bradshaw – WG; (Australia) 26 Tiana Power – WG, CE	Head coach: (England) Denis Betts; Legend: (c) Captain(s); (vc) Vice-captain(s); Updated: 08 June 2025; Source(s):

== See also ==
- 2025 Wigan Warriors Men's season
