= Carys Marsh =

Wales international rugby league footballer

Personal information
- Full name: Carys Louise Marsh
- Born: 14 September 1997 (age 29) Newton-le-Willows, St Helens, England

Playing information
- Position: Hooker, Halfback
Club
Years	Team	Pld	T	G	FG	P
2018	St Helens	0	0	0	0	0
2019–	Wigan Warriors	57	4	0	0	16
	Total	57	4	0	0	16
Representative
Years	Team	Pld	T	G	FG	P
2021–	Wales	13	1	0	0	4
- Source: As of 1 November 2026

Carys Marsh (born 14 September 1997) is a Wales international rugby league footballer who plays as a hooker for Wigan Warriors in the Women's Super League and Wales at international level.

== Club career ==
=== 2018 ===
Marsh signed for St Helens ahead of the inaugural Women's Super League season in 2018.

=== 2019-21 ===
In 2019, Marsh signed for Women's Super League rivals Wigan Warriors.

=== 2022 ===
Marsh scored her first try of 2022 in round 1 of the Women's Challenge Cup, in a 6–44 win over Bradford Bulls at Horsfall Stadium.

Marsh played a total of 13 times in the 2022 season, scoring once in nine Super League appearances, and crossing twice in four Challenge Cup matches.

=== 2023 ===
Marsh played 14 times in the 2023 season, appearing 10 times in the Betfred Women's Super League, and also playing 4 times in the 2023 Women's Challenge Cup as Wigan reached the semi final stage, ultimately losing 16–4 to Leeds Rhinos at Headingley Stadium.

=== 2024 ===
Marsh played 8 times in the 2024 season, and appeared in the semi finals of the 2024 Women's Challenge Cup as Wigan lost 18–4 to St Helens at the Totally Wicked Stadium.

=== 2025 ===
On 7 June, Marsh played for Wigan in the 2025 Women's Challenge Cup final, helping Wigan to defeat St Helens 42–6. Marsh made 5 appearances in the competition, as Wigan claimed their maiden title.

Marsh played 12 times in the Super League in the 2025 season. She was part of the Wigan Warriors side that completed the treble in the 2025 season, winning the League Leader's Shield, Super League, Women's Challenge Cup, the team also won the RFL Women's Nines.

== International career ==
On 25 June 2021, Marsh made her first senior appearance for Wales against England in a 60–0 defeat.

Marsh scored her first try for Wales in a 60–0 win over Italy in the Women's European Championship B 2022 on 19 June 2022.

== Club statistics ==
Club	Season	Tier	App	T	G	DG	Pts
Wigan Warriors	2022	Super League	13	3	0	0	12
Wigan Warriors	2023	Super League	14	0	0	0	0
Wigan Warriors	2024	Super League	8	0	0	0	0
Wigan Warriors	2025	Super League	17	0	0	0	0
Wigan Warriors	2026	Super League	5	1	0	0	4
Wigan Warriors	2027	Super League					
Wigan Warriors	Total		57	4	0	0	16
Career total			57	4	0	0	16

== Honours ==
=== Wigan Warriors ===
- Super League
  - Winners (1): 2025
  - League Leader's Shield (1): 2025
- Challenge Cup
  - Winners (1): 2025
- RFL Women's Nines
  - Winners (2): 2024, 2025
