= List of England women's national rugby league players =

List of English rugby players

List of England women's national rugby league players is a list of people who have played for the England women's national rugby league team.

Heritage Numbers (H#) were determined by the Women in Rugby League project in collaboration with England Rugby League.

== Player register ==
As of 17 November 2026

The sources section below provides an explanation of the many sources used in the initial preparation of this list.
Tries and goals are incomplete for five matches in the years 2007, 2008, and 2009. See the points section below for further details.

H#	Player	Position(s)	Record				Debut					Last
H#	Player	Position(s)	M	T	G	P	Date	Opponent	Age	Club	Ref	Last
1	Lindsay Anfield	FB	13	2	2	12	7 Jul 2007	FRA	24	Wakefield Panthers		2013
2	Dannielle Titterington	WG	9	2	0	8	7 Jul 2007	FRA	27	Bradford Thunderbirds		2013
3	Vicky Molyneux	SR, CE, LF	8	0	0	0	7 Jul 2007	FRA	19	Hillside Hawks		2023
4	Natalie Gilmour	CE, LF	18	13	31	114	7 Jul 2007	FRA	31	Wakefield Panthers		2013
5	Michelle Greenwood	WG	8	8	0	32	7 Jul 2007	FRA	–	Wakefield Panthers		2010
6	Gemma Walsh	SO, SH	14	6	3	30	7 Jul 2007	FRA	24	Wakefield Panthers		2013
7	Danielle Bose	SO, SH	5	1	0	4	7 Jul 2007	FRA	19	Bradford Thunderbirds		2015
8	Andrea Dobson	LF, PR, SR	24	0	8	16	7 Jul 2007	FRA	20	Hillside Hawks		2018
9	Claire Hall	HK, SH	11	2	0	8	7 Jul 2007	FRA	–	Copeland Wildcats		2013
10	Amanda Donaldson	PR, SR	12	3	0	12	7 Jul 2007	FRA	16	Copeland Wildcats		2011
11	Sue Cochrane	SR	6	0	0	0	7 Jul 2007	FRA	–	Wakefield Panthers		2008
12	Beth Sutcliffe	LF, PR, SR	20	4	0	16	7 Jul 2007	FRA	24	Hillside Hawks		2017
13	Aimee Bradshaw	SR	3	0	0	0	7 Jul 2007	FRA	–	Warrington Wolves		2008
14	Sarah Harrison	IN	1	0	0	0	7 Jul 2007	FRA	–	Hillside Hawks		2007
15	Debbie Hodgkinson	IN	4	0	0	0	7 Jul 2007	FRA	–	Wakefield Panthers		2008
16	Rachel Twibill	WG, FB, SR	18	9	0	36	7 Jul 2007	FRA	22	Bradford Thunderbirds		2013
17	Christina Ovendon	IN	1	0	0	0	7 Jul 2007	FRA	–	West London Sharks		2007
18	Joanne Watmore	CE, SO, LF	13	13	0	52	13 Jul 2008	FRA	21	Halton		2011
19	Laura Rowell	SO	1	0	0	0	13 Jul 2008	FRA	–	—	–	2008
20	Emma Slowe	PR	23	3	0	12	13 Jul 2008	FRA	25	Wakefield Panthers		2017
21	Katie O'Toole	HK, SR	9	0	0	0	13 Jul 2008	FRA	–	Townville Tigers		2009
22	Sophie Lazenby	IN	6	2	0	8	13 Jul 2008	FRA	–	West Hull		2008
23	Jenny Welsby	SH, SO	8	1	0	4	13 Jul 2008	FRA	–	Hillside Hawks		2017
24	Lisa Taylor	SR	4	0	3	6	13 Jul 2008	FRA	–	Middleton Marauders		2009
25	Kirsty Moroney	SH, SO	19	6	0	24	6 Nov 2008	RUS	–	Bradford Thunderbirds		2017
26	Leah Carey	SR	2	0	0	0	8 Nov 2008	FRA	–	West London Sharks		2008
27	Emily Rudge	SR, LF, SH	32	17	0	68	10 Nov 2008	AUS	16	Warrington Wolves		2024
28	Heidi Schelburg	WG	2	0	0	0	12 Nov 2008	NZL	–	West London Sharks		2008
29	Amy Hardcastle	CE, FB, WG	29	30	0	120	18 Jul 2009	FRA	20	Siddal		2025
30	Charlene Henegan	WG	3	0	0	0	18 Jul 2009	FRA	21	Bradford Thunderbirds		2010
31	Sarah Roper	PR	2	0	0	0	18 Jul 2009	FRA	–	Combined Services		2009
32	Mags Lowish	IN	1	0	0	0	18 Jul 2009	FRA	–	Nottingham Outlaws		2009
33	Jodie Cunningham	LF, FB, CE, WG, SO	38	9	0	36	18 Jul 2009	FRA	17	Warrington Wolves		2026
34	Hannah Bairstow	WG, FB	5	1	0	4	18 Jul 2009	FRA	–	Middleton Marauders		2012
35	Kelsey Morgan	SO	1	0	0	0	25 Jul 2009	FRA	–	Wakefield Panthers		2009
36	Isobel Howard	IN	2	0	0	0	25 Jul 2009	FRA	–	Warrington Wolves	–	2010
37	Lois Forsell	HK, LF	18	3	0	12	10 Jul 2010	FRA	18	Middleton Marauders	ERL	2017
38	Holly Freestone	SR	9	2	0	8	10 Jul 2010	FRA	24	Copeland Wildcats	ERL	2013
39	Clare Robinson	CE, PR, SR	10	3	0	12	10 Jul 2010	FRA	26	Warrington Wolves		2013
40	Paula McCourt	SR	2	1	0	4	10 Oct 2010	NZL	30	Wakefield Panthers		2010
41	Kim Field	LF, PR, SR	6	1	0	4	16 Oct 2010	NZL	26	Combined Services		2013
42	Rebecca Williams	IN	3	1	0	4	2 Jul 2011	FRA	–	Nottingham Outlaws		2012
43	Tara-Jane Stanley	FB, WG, CE	21	17	75	218	15 Jun 2012	FRA	18	Widnes Vikings	ERL	2023
44	Lauren Stallwood	WG	4	0	0	0	15 Jun 2012	FRA	–	Bradford Thunderbirds		2013
45	Danielle Bound	HK	11	2	0	8	15 Jun 2012	FRA	18	Warrington Wolves		2017
46	Holly Myers	WG	2	3	0	12	8 Jul 2013	NZL	–	Coventry/Southampton		2013
47	Katie Cooper-Birkenhead	SH	3	1	1	6	11 Jul 2013	FRA	–	Featherstone Rovers		2016
48	Lori Holloran	LF	1	0	0	0	11 Jul 2013	FRA	–	Normanton		2013
49	Charlotte Booth	WG, FB	10	5	0	20	17 Jun 2015	FRA	–	Bradford Thunderbirds		2019
50	Tara Jones	HK, CE, SO,	14	6	0	24	17 Jun 2015	FRA	18	Thatto Heath Crusaders		2023
51	Sarah Dunn	CE, WG	5	1	0	4	17 Jun 2015	FRA	34	Stanningley		2017
52	Kayleigh Bulman	WG	6	2	0	8	17 Jun 2015	FRA	–	Featherstone Rovers		2017
53	Sarah Fletcher	PR	2	0	0	0	17 Jun 2015	FRA	–	Normanton		2015
54	Carrie Roberts	CE, SR	4	4	1	18	17 Jun 2015	FRA	–	Combined Services		2022
55	Jessica Courtman	CE, SR	7	0	1	2	17 Jun 2015	FRA	–	Bradford Thunderbirds		2017
56	Danika Priim	PR	7	0	0	0	17 Jun 2015	FRA	30	Stanningley		2017
57	Faye Gaskin	SO, SH	8	0	0	0	17 Jun 2015	FRA	23	Thatto Heath Crusaders		2019
58	Samantha Simpson	WG	1	0	0	0	20 Jun 2015	FRA	–	Thatto Heath Crusaders		2015
59	Amy Robinson	SH	1	0	0	0	20 Jun 2015	FRA	–	Combined Services		2015
60	Stacey White	LF, SR	2	0	0	0	20 Jun 2015	FRA	–	Normanton		2017
61	Georgia Sutherland	CE	1	0	0	0	22 Oct 2016	FRA	19	Leigh Miners Rangers		2016
62	Claire Garner	SO, SH	3	0	3	6	22 Oct 2016	FRA	26	Bradford Bulls		2017
63	Rhiannon Marshall	LF, PR	3	1	0	4	22 Oct 2016	FRA	23	Bradford Bulls		2019
64	Natalie Harrowell	SR	3	1	0	4	22 Oct 2016	FRA	26	Featherstone Rovers		2017
65	Sinead Peach	HK	6	1	0	4	22 Oct 2016	FRA	18	Featherstone Rovers		2023
66	Brogan Churm	IN	1	0	0	0	21 Jun 2017	FRA	–	Featherstone Rovers		2017
67	Chantelle Crowl	PR, SR	9	0	0	0	21 Jun 2017	FRA	24	Thatto Heath Crusaders		2021
68	Shona Hoyle	PR, SR	22	5	0	20	21 Jun 2017	FRA	23	Bradford Bulls		2026
69	Rachel Thompson	CE	3	1	0	4	21 Jun 2017	FRA	22	Thatto Heath Crusaders		2019
70	Katherine Hepworth	IN	4	0	0	0	24 Jun 2017	FRA	–	Castleford Tigers	–	2017
71	Rebecca Greenfield	WG	2	2	0	8	27 Oct 2018	FRA	20	Wigan Warriors		2019
72	Naomi Williams	CE	3	2	0	8	27 Oct 2018	FRA	27	St Helens		2019
73	Caitlin Beevers	WG, FB, CE	10	8	0	32	27 Oct 2018	FRA	17	Leeds Rhinos		2024
74	Georgia Roche	SH, SO	16	8	0	32	27 Oct 2018	FRA	19	Castleford Tigers		2026
75	Dannielle Anderson	PR	5	1	0	4	27 Oct 2018	FRA	23	Leeds Rhinos		2022
76	Amy Johnson	PR	2	0	0	0	27 Oct 2018	FRA	25	Leeds Rhinos		2019
77	Victoria Whitfield	IN	17	1	0	4	27 Oct 2018	FRA	22	St Helens		2026
78	Grace Field	PR	10	1	0	4	9 Nov 2019	PNG	22	Castleford Tigers		2023
79	Kelsey Gentles	WG	1	0	0	0	9 Nov 2019	PNG	20	Castleford Tigers		2019
80	Shannon Lacey	LF, SR	2	0	0	0	9 Nov 2019	PNG	19	Leeds Rhinos		2019
81	Tamzin Renouf	CE	6	2	0	8	9 Nov 2019	PNG	18	Castleford Tigers		2026
82	Georgia Wilson	WG	8	4	0	16	16 Nov 2019	PNG	22	Wigan Warriors		2026
83	Leah Burke	WG	7	10	0	40	16 Nov 2019	PNG	20	St Helens		2023
84	Fran Goldthorp	FB, WG, CE	11	7	0	28	25 Jun 2021	WAL	18	Leeds Rhinos		2026
85	Beth Stott	SH	4	0	3	6	25 Jun 2021	WAL	31	St Helens		2022
86	Paige Travis	SR, PR	9	4	0	16	25 Jun 2021	WAL	21	St Helens		2025
87	Hollie-Mae Dodd	SR	14	9	0	36	25 Jun 2021	WAL	17	Castleford Tigers		2026
88	Savannah Andrade	CE	2	0	0	0	23 Oct 2021	FRA	21	York City Knights		2025
89	Rachael Woosey	IN	1	0	0	0	23 Oct 2021	FRA	24	St Helens		2021
90	Caroline Collie	WG	1	0	0	0	12 Jun 2022	WAL	35	Bedford Tigers		2022
91	Zoe Harris	SO	6	1	0	4	12 Jun 2022	WAL	25	St Helens		2025
92	Olivia Wood	PR	13	2	0	8	12 Jun 2022	WAL	20	York City Knights		2026
93	Courtney Winfield-Hill	SH, SO	5	3	0	12	18 Jun 2022	FRA	35	Leeds Rhinos		2022
94	Keara Bennett	HK	13	1	0	4	18 Jun 2022	FRA	19	Leeds Rhinos		2026
95	Zoe Hornby	IN	3	0	0	0	5 Nov 2022	CAN	23	Leeds Rhinos		2024
96	Eboni Partington	WG	6	5	0	20	29 Apr 2023	FRA	20	St Helens		2025
97	Lacey Owen	IN	1	1	0	4	4 Nov 2023	WAL	23	York Valkyrie		2023
98	Georgie Dagger	FB	2	1	0	4	29 Jun 2024	FRA	26	York Valkyrie		2025
99	Anna Davies	WG	8	12	0	48	29 Jun 2024	FRA	29	Wigan Warriors		2026
100	Isabel Rowe	SH	7	3	38	88	29 Jun 2024	FRA	17	Wigan Warriors		2026
101	Katie Mottershead	HK	4	1	0	4	29 Jun 2024	FRA	20	St Helens		2025
102	Bella Sykes	IN	4	1	0	4	29 Jun 2024	FRA	19	Leeds Rhinos		2025
103	Amelia Brown	FB	3	5	0	20	2 Nov 2024	WAL	20	Huddersfield Giants		2026
104	Erin Stott	CE	1	1	0	4	2 Nov 2024	WAL	21	Huddersfield Giants		2024
105	Izzy Northrop	PR	3	0	0	0	2 Nov 2024	WAL	24	Leeds Rhinos		2025
106	Grace Banks	FB	1	0	0	0	9 Aug 2025	WAL	19	Wigan Warriors		2025
107	Molly Jones	CE	2	1	0	4	9 Aug 2025	WAL	20	Wigan Warriors		2026
108	Jenna Foubister	SO	4	2	0	8	9 Aug 2025	WAL	18	Wigan Warriors		2026
109	Lucy Murray	SR	4	3	0	12	9 Aug 2025	WAL	22	Leeds Rhinos		2026
110	Eva Hunter	SR	4	3	0	12	9 Aug 2025	WAL	20	Wigan Warriors		2026
111	Ruby Bruce	IN	2	0	0	0	9 Aug 2025	WAL	18	Leeds Rhinos		2026
112	Evie Cousins	CE	2	1	0	4	25 Jul 2026	FRA	20	Leeds Rhinos		2026
113	Ellise Derbyshire	WG	1	2	0	8	25 Jul 2026	FRA	21	Wigan Warriors		2026
114	Mary Coleman	PR	3	0	0	0	25 Jul 2026	FRA	28	Wigan Warriors		2026
115	Megan Williams	LF	4	0	0	0	25 Jul 2026	FRA	21	Wigan Warriors		2026
116	Ella Donnelly	IN	1	1	0	4	25 Jul 2026	FRA	29	Leeds Rhinos		2026
117	Connie Boyd	CE	3	3	0	12	17 Oct 2026	WAL	20	Leeds Rhinos		2026
118	Jasmin Strange	SR	1	1	0	4	17 Oct 2026	WAL	23	Sydney Roosters		2026
119	Hope Millard	IN	2	0	0	0	17 Oct 2026	WAL	21	Canterbury Bulldogs		2026
120	Lucie Sams	IN	2	0	0	0	24 Oct 2026	AUS	20	Wigan Warriors		2026

=== Notes ===
==== Positions ====
- Where a player has played in more than one position, the most common is listed first.
- The following abbreviations are used
  - FB = Fullback
  - WG = Wing
  - CE = Centre
  - SO = Stand-off
  - SH = Scrum-half
  - PR = Prop
  - SR = Second-row
  - LF = Loose forward
  - IN = interchange
- Interchange (IN) is listed only when a player's appearances have all been off the interchange bench.

==== Points ====
- The tally of individual tries and goals is missing detail from five matches.
  - 2007 vs France, all 16 points unknown.
  - 2008 vs France, only 12 of 42 points known. An online article, now archived, that lists the squad for the 2008 World Cup in November 2008 mentions that winger Michelle Greenwood scored a hat-trick of tries in the match against France in July 2008.
  - 2008 vs Russia (World Cup), 66 of 72 points are known. A report in the League Express noted eight try-scorers for a combined 13 tries and two goal-kickers for a combined seven goals.
  - 2008 vs France (World Cup), 40 of 54 points are known. A report in the League Express noted seven try-scorers for a combined ten tries, but goal-kickers were not mentioned.
  - 2009 vs France (First Test), 24 of 28 points are known. A brief match report in the Bradford Telegraph and Argus notes five try-scorers, scoring a combined six tries, but goal-kickers were not mentioned.
- Drop goal / field goal column excluded as, to date, no England player has kicked a drop goal / field goal in Internationals.

==== Debut ====
- The club listed is the club with whom the individual was playing, or had most recently played, at the time of making her debut.

== Sources ==
Playing data presented in this list page is compiled from multiple sources, that are online, indirectly online, and offline.

For a full list of the matches abbreviated on the tables below, see the results section on the main page.

=== Rugby League Records ===
Many matches played by England women's national rugby league team are directly available on the external, database website, Rugby League Records.

England women's matches at Rugby League Records
Matches	0	1	2	3	4	5	6	7	8	9
0 — 9	—	2007	2008	2008	2008	2008	2008	2008	2009	2009
10 — 19	2010	2010	2010	2011	2011	2012	2013	2013	2013	2013
20 — 29	2015	2015	2016	2017	2017	2017	2017	2017	2017	2018
30 — 39	2019	2019	2021	2021	2022	2022	2022	2022	2022	2022
40 — 49	2023	2023	2024	2024	2025	2025	2026	2026	2026	2026

=== European Rugby League ===
Team lists, scorers and written reports for many matches played by England women's national rugby league team are directly available on the external website, European Rugby League.

England women's match reports with team lists at European Rugby League
Matches	0	1	2	3	4	5	6	7	8	9
0 — 9	—	2007	2008	2008	2008	2008	2008	2008	2009	2009
10 — 19	2010	2010	2010	2011	2011	2012	2013	2013	2013	2013
20 — 29	2015	2015	2016	2017	2017	2017	2017	2017	2017	2018
30 — 39	2019	2019	2021	2021	2022	2022	2022	2022	2022	2022
40 — 43	2023	2023	2024	2024	2025	2025				

=== Other online sources ===
- 2007 Only Test, team named prior to the game, list of players includes their club.
- 2008 World Cup squad, list of players includes their club.
- 2008 World Cup vs Russia, brief report.
- 2008 World Cup vs New Zealand, brief report with point scorers.
- 2008 World Cup vs Pacific Islands, brief report with point scorers.
- 2010 Tour to New Zealand, article listing squad members with their club.
- 2010 1st Test vs New Zealand, match reports with point scorers named.
- 2011 Tour to France, article listing squad members with their club.
- 2013 World Cup, article with list of squad members and their club.
- 2015 Tour to France, article with list of squad members and their club.
- 2016 Only Test, match report with team lists. For the England players, this list includes their club.
- 2017 1st Test, match report with team lists. For the England players, this list includes their club.
- 2018 Only Test, article listing squad members with their club.
- 2018 Only Test, match report with scorers listed.
- 2019 1st Test, article listing team members with their club, jersey number, and heritage number.
- 2019 1st Test, NRL match centre.
- 2019 2nd Test, NRL story and match centre.
- 2021 Test vs Wales, article listing squad members with their club.
- 2021 Test vs France, article listing squad members with their club.
- 2022 Test in June vs Wales and France, article listing squad members with their club.
- 2022 Postponed 2021 World Cup, article listing squad members with their club.
- 2023 Test vs France, article listing squad members with their club.
- 2023 Test vs Wales, article listing squad members with their club.
- 2024 Test vs France, article listing squad members with their club.
- 2024 Test vs Wales, article listing squad members with their club.
- Team photos posted on social media
  - 2007.
  - 2008 World Cup (informal).
  - 2009, with a caption that lists the staff, players and their clubs.
  - 2015.

=== Indirect online sources ===
The following articles are accessible via eResources such as NewsBank and ProQuest. One means of accessing eResources is through participating libraries. For example, the State Library of New South Wales provides free access to eResources for residents of New South Wales who are library members.

- 2008 World Cup vs Russia, brief reports in newspapers.
- 2008 World Cup vs France, brief reports in newspapers.
- 2008 World Cup vs Australia, match report with point scorers. Brief report in newspaper.
- 2009 1st Test, brief report with try scorers.
- 2009 2nd Test, brief report with point scorers.
- 2012 Only Test, brief articles listing players from clubs within a newspaper's circulation selected in the England squad.

=== Offline sources ===
- 2008 World Cup programme, squad listed with jersey numbers.
- 2008 World Cup, England squad members listed with clubs, copied from a Sports Focus website article, since removed.
- 2008 World Cup vs France, brief report with team list and try-scorers, copied from a Sports Focus website article, since removed.
