= Tiana Power =

Australian rugby league footballer

Personal information
- Born: 16 December 2000 (age 24) Bowen, North Queensland, Australia

Playing information
- Position: Wing, Centre
Club
Years	Team	Pld	T	G	FG	P
2025–	Wigan Warriors	10	16	0	0	64
- Source: As of 14 October 2025

Tiana Power (born 16 December 2000) is an Australian rugby league footballer who plays as a winger for Wigan Warriors in the Women's Super League.

== Background ==
Power was born in North Queensland, Australia to a Sicilian mother and an Indigenous Australian father.

== Club career ==
Prior to joining Wigan Warriors, Power spent four years with Townsville Western Lions in the Rugby League Townsville & District League, where she won two premierships. She also featured for North Queensland Gold Stars in 2022.

=== 2025 ===
In 2025, Power and her older sister, Shaniah, both signed for Wigan Warriors for the upcoming Super League season.

In round 1 of the 2025 Women's Challenge Cup, Power made her debut for the club, scoring two tries in an 84-0 win over Barrow Raiders at the Brick Community Stadium.

In round 8 of the 2025 Women's Super League season, Power scored four tries in a 0-80 win over Warrington Wolves.

== Club statistics ==
Club	Season	Tier	App	T	G	DG	Pts
Wigan Warriors	2025	Super League	10	16	0	0	64
Wigan Warriors	Total		10	16	0	0	64
Career total			10	16	0	0	64

== Honours ==
=== Wigan Warriors ===
- Super League
  - League Leader's Shield (1): 2025
