= Eva Hunter =

England international rugby league footballer

Personal information
- Born: 16 July 2005 (age 21) Wigan, Greater Manchester, England

Playing information
- Position: Second-row
Club
Years	Team	Pld	T	G	FG	P
2022–	Wigan Warriors	50	45	0	0	180
Representative
Years	Team	Pld	T	G	FG	P
2025–	England	3	2	0	0	8
- Source: As of 24 October 2026

Eva Hunter (born 16 July 2005) is an English rugby league footballer who plays as a second-row for Wigan Warriors in the Women's Super League and England at international level. She was Woman of Steel, for the 2025 season.

== Club career ==
Hunter started playing rugby with junior clubs Wigan St Judes and Orrell St James before being signed by Wigan as a member of the club's academy squad. Hunter was a member of the Rugby Football League's diploma in sporting excellence (DiSE) programme in 2021–2022.

=== 2022 ===
Hunter made her debut for Wigan Warriors against the Huddersfield Giants in round 8 of the 2022 season, in a 42-4 victory at the Robin Park Arena. She played a total of three games throughout the season.

=== 2023 ===
In 2023, Hunter scored her first try for Wigan Warriors, crossing in a 22-22 draw against Warrington Wolves on 16 April 2023.

Hunter scored three tries in total in the 2023 season, appearing nine times in the Betfred Women's Super League, also playing four matches in the 2023 Women's Challenge Cup as Wigan reached the semi final stage, ultimately losing 16-4 to Leeds Rhinos at Headingley Stadium.

=== 2024 ===
Hunter played 11 times in the 2024 season, scoring six tries in the league, and two in the Challenge Cup.

On 21 July, Hunter scored twice in a 10-18 victory over York Valkyrie at the LNER Community Stadium.

On 1 September, Hunter scored a further two tries, this time in a 82-0 victory over Warrington Wolves.

=== 2025 ===
In round 2, Hunter scored her first hatrick for Wigan Warriors, in a 106-6 defeat of Barrow Raiders.

On 7 June, Hunter played for Wigan in the 2025 Women's Challenge Cup final, scoring a try and defeating St Helens 42-6. Hunter scored 6 tries in 5 appearances in the competition, as Wigan claimed their maiden title.

Hunter finished the season as joint top try-scorer with 20, alongside St Helens winger Danielle McGifford. She was part of the Wigan Warriors side that completed the treble in the 2025 season, winning the League Leader's Shield, Super League, Women's Challenge Cup, the team also won the RFL Women's Nines.

Hunter set a new Wigan club record by scoring tries in 13 consecutive games, beating the previous record of 11 held by Steve Ella, Martin Offiah and Sam Tomkins.

At the end of 2025, Hunter became the first Wigan player to be named Woman of Steel ahead of her Wigan teammates Jenna Foubister and Isabel Rowe.

Hunter's younger sister, Ruby also plays for Wigan.

=== 2026 ===
On 30 May, Hunter played for Wigan in the 2026 Women's Challenge Cup Final, scoring a record-equalling four tries in a 54-6 victory over St Helens. This was Hunter's second Challenge Cup win as a player, after winning it in 2025.

== International career ==
On 9 August 2025, Hunter made her first senior appearance for England against Wales. She scored two tries in a 62-0 win.

== Club statistics ==
Club	Season	Tier	App	T	G	DG	Pts
Wigan Warriors	2022	Super League	3	0	0	0	0
Wigan Warriors	2023	Super League	13	3	0	0	12
Wigan Warriors	2024	Super League	11	8	0	0	32
Wigan Warriors	2025	Super League	20	26	0	0	104
Wigan Warriors	2026	Super League	3	8	0	0	32
Wigan Warriors	2027	Super League					
Wigan Warriors	Total		50	45	0	0	180
Career total			50	45	0	0	180

== Honours ==
=== Wigan Warriors ===
- Super League
  - Winners (1): 2025
  - League Leader's Shield (1): 2025
- Challenge Cup
  - Winners (2): 2025, 2026
- RFL Women's Nines
  - Winners (2): 2024, 2025

=== Individual ===
- Woman of Steel: 2025
