= Georgia Wilson (rugby league) =

England international rugby league footballer (born 1997)

Personal information
- Full name: Georgia Louise Wilson
- Born: 23 February 1997 (age 29) Burton-in-Kendal, Cumbria, England

Playing information
- Position: Fullback, Wing, Centre
Club
| Years | Team | Pld | T | G | FG | P |
|---|---|---|---|---|---|---|
| 2018–22 | Wigan Warriors | 12 | 6 | 24 | 0 | 72 |
| 2023 | Souths Logan Magpies | 7 | 3 | 16 | 0 | 44 |
| 2024 | Norths Devils | 5 | 3 | 5 | 0 | 22 |
| 2024– | Wigan Warriors | 33 | 16 | 0 | 0 | 64 |
| | Total | 57 | 28 | 45 | 0 | 202 |
Representative
| Years | Team | Pld | T | G | FG | P |
| 2019– | England | 7 | 4 | 0 | 0 | 16 |
- Source: RLP As of 30 October 2026

Georgia Wilson (born 23 February 1997) is an English rugby league footballer who plays as a fullback, centre, or wing for Wigan Warriors in the Women's Super League and England at international level.

== Club career ==
Born in Burton-in-Kendal, Wilson first started playing rugby union for Kendal Rugby Club before being signed by Wigan Warriors. When at the Warriors, Wilson began studying at the University of Central Lancashire in Preston, and also played football for Lancaster City FC Ladies.

=== 2018-22 ===
Wilson joined Wigan for their inaugural season in 2018 and scored a crucial try in their 18-16 Grand Final victory over Leeds Rhinos at the Manchester Regional Arena.

Wilson spent four years at Wigan in what would be her first stint at the club, playing as a full back, centre, and winger, and making a total of 43 appearances, kicking 47 goals and scoring 30 tries.

=== 2023 ===
Ahead of the 2023 season, Wilson joined Souths Logan Magpies, scoring three tries and kicking 16 goals in seven appearances.

=== 2024 ===
In 2024, Wilson joined Norths Devils, where she made five appearances, kicking 5 goals and scoring a hat trick against former side Souths Logan Magpies.

Later in the year, Wilson rejoined Wigan Warriors. She made a total of 11 appearances in the season, scoring three tries, with Wigan ultimately losing 18-4 in the play-off semifinals against St Helens.

=== 2025 ===
On 7 June, Wilson played for Wigan in the 2025 Women's Challenge Cup final, defeating St Helens 42-6. Wilson scored 4 tries in 5 appearances in the competition, as Wigan claimed their maiden title.

Wilson was part of the Wigan Warriors side that completed the treble in the 2025 season, winning the League Leader's Shield, Super League, and Women's Challenge Cup. The team also won the RFL Women's Nines.

Wilson finished the season with 9 tries in 17 matches.

== International career ==
On 16 November 2019, Wilson made her debut for England in 20-16 defeat against Papua New Guinea at the PNG Football Stadium.

On 25 June 2021, Wilson scored her first try for England in a 60-0 win over Wales at the Halliwell Jones stadium.

== Club statistics ==
| Club | Season | Tier | App | T | G | DG | Pts |
|---|---|---|---|---|---|---|---|
| Wigan Warriors | 2022 | Super League | 12 | 6 | 24 | 0 | 72 |
| Wigan Warriors | Total | | 12 | 6 | 24 | 0 | 72 |
| Souths Logan Magpies | 2023 | Women's Premiership | 7 | 3 | 16 | 0 | 44 |
| Souths Logan Magpies | Total | | 7 | 3 | 16 | 0 | 44 |
| Norths Devils | 2024 | Women's Premiership | 5 | 3 | 5 | 0 | 22 |
| Norths Devils | Total | | 5 | 3 | 5 | 0 | 22 |
| Wigan Warriors | 2024 | Super League | 11 | 3 | 0 | 0 | 12 |
| Wigan Warriors | 2025 | Super League | 17 | 9 | 0 | 0 | 36 |
| Wigan Warriors | 2026 | Super League | 5 | 4 | 0 | 0 | 16 |
| Wigan Warriors | 2027 | Super League | | | | | |
| Wigan Warriors | Total | | 33 | 16 | 0 | 0 | 64 |
| Career total | | | 57 | 28 | 45 | 0 | 202 |

== Honours ==
=== Wigan Warriors ===
- Super League
  - Winners (2): 2018, 2025
  - League Leader's Shield (1): 2025
- Challenge Cup
  - Winners (1): 2025
- RFL Women's Nines
  - Winners (1): 2024
