= 2024 Women's Challenge Cup =

Women's rugby league competition

- Duration: Group stage plus three knockout rounds
- Number of teams: 16
- Winners: St Helens
- Runners-up: Leeds Rhinos
- Biggest home win: Huddersfield Giants 74–0 Hull KR; (16 March); York Valkyrie 80–6 Featherstone Rovers; (6 April); St Helens 74–0 Huddersfield Giants; (13 April); York Valkyrie 74–0 Featherstone Rovers; (14 April)
- Biggest away win: Hull KR 0–90 Leeds Rhinos; (24 March)

The 2024 Women's Challenge Cup (sponsored as the 2024 Betfred Women's Challenge Cup) was the 12th staging of the Rugby Football League's cup competition for women's rugby league clubs. The final took place on 8 June 2024 as part of a triple-header at Wembley Stadium alongside the men's final, and the final of the 1895 Cup. In the final, St Helens defeated Leeds Rhinos 22–0 to retain the title.

== Format ==
The competition used the same format as in 2023 with four groups of four competing in a single round robin with group winners and runners-up advancing to the knockout rounds. The teams were announced on 22 December 2023 and the group stage draw took place on 10 January.

St Helens, winners in 2023, were in the top seed pool alongside Leeds Rhinos, Wigan Warriors, and York Valkyrie. The four remaining Super League teams were in pool two. The other pools consisted of teams from the regional leagues with pool three containing sides who took part in the 2023 Super League. Hull KR and 2023 Super League South grand finalists Cardiff Demons and London Broncos were in pool four with Sheffield Eagles who were making their debut in the competition.

Seeding pots for group stage draw
Pool 1	Pool 2	Pool 3	Pool 4
Leeds Rhinos; St Helens; Wigan Warriors; York Valkyrie	Barrow Raiders; Featherstone Rovers; Huddersfield Giants; Warrington Wolves	Bradford Bulls; Castleford Tigers; Leigh Leopards; Salford Red Devils	Cardiff Demons; Hull Kingston Rovers; London Broncos; Sheffield Eagles

The draw for the group stages and the quarter finals was made on 10 January. Each of the four top-seeded teams had only one home game in the group stage.

Groups
Group 1	Group 2	Group 3	Group 4
Sheffield Eagles; Castleford Tigers; Featherstone Rovers; York Valkyrie	Cardiff Demons; Salford Red Devils; Barrow Raiders; Wigan Warriors	London Broncos; Bradford Bulls; Warrington Wolves; St Helens	Hull Kingston Rovers; Leigh Leopards; Huddersfield Giants; Leeds Rhinos

When the group stage fixtures were announced on 24 January, it was also announced that Castleford Tigers had withdrawn from the competition and group 1 would, therefore, comprise only three clubs.

== Group stage ==
Games were scheduled to take place in March and April.

Challenge Cup group stage, round one fixtures
Gp	Home	Score	Away	Match Information
Gp	Home	Score	Away	Date and Time	Venue	Referee	Attendance
1	Sheffield Eagles	10–74	York Valkyrie	17 March, 14:00	Sheffield Olympic Legacy Stadium
2	Cardiff Demons	22–16	Barrow Raiders	16 March, 14:00	Cardiff University Sports Fields
2	Salford Red Devils	0–68	Wigan Warriors	17 March, 14:15	Salford Community Pitches
3	Bradford Bulls	4–52	Warrington Wolves	16 March, 14:00	Odsal Stadium
3	St Helens	64–0	London Broncos	16 March, 15:00	Totally Wicked Stadium
4	Huddersfield Giants	74–0	Hull KR	16 March, 12:00	Kirklees Stadium
4	Leigh Leopards	4–52	Leeds Rhinos	17 March, 12:00	Twist Lane

Challenge Cup group stage, round two fixtures
Gp	Home	Score	Away	Match Information
Gp	Home	Score	Away	Date and Time	Venue	Referee	Attendance
2	Cardiff Demons	58–0	Salford Red Devils	23 March, 14:00	Cardiff University Sports Fields
3	Bradford Bulls	C–C	St Helens	Match forfeited by Bradford Bulls. Awarded as a 48–0 win to St Helens.
4	Leigh Leopards	6–36	Huddersfield Giants	23 March, 14:00	Twist Lane
4	Hull KR	0–90	Leeds Rhinos	24 March, 14:00	Craven Park
1	Featherstone Rovers	38–6	Sheffield Eagles	24 March, 12:00	Post Office Road
2	Barrow Raiders	18–20	Wigan Warriors	24 March, 14:00	Craven Park
3	London Broncos	6–24	Warrington Wolves	24 March, 15:30	Rosslyn Park F.C.
Source: (Note: For the Hull KR v Leeds match, BBC Sport and Hull KR gave the score as 0–90, as does the RFL "match centre", but the RFL review article gave the score as 0–92, noting this to equal the club record for Leeds (set in the 2022 Women's Challenge Cup). The description on the Leeds match report also initially stated the score to be 0–92 but was later amended to 0–90. The description credits all 13 goals to Enright – setting an individual club record total of 38 points (3 tries and 13 goals), but the score list of has only 12 goals by Enright and one by Whitehead.)

Challenge Cup group stage, round three fixtures
Gp	Home	Score	Away	Match Information
Gp	Home	Score	Away	Date and Time	Venue	Referee	Attendance
1	York Valkyrie	80–6	Featherstone Rovers	6 April, 13:00	York St John Sports Park
3	Warrington Wolves	6–58	St Helens	7 April, 11:00	Dallam Playing Fields
4	Leeds Rhinos	54–10	Huddersfield Giants	7 April, 12:00	West Park RUFC
4	Hull KR	0–46	Leigh Leopards	7 April, 14:00	Craven Park
2	Wigan Warriors	44–4	Cardiff Demons	7 April, 14:00	Robin Park Arena
2	Salford Red Devils	0–46	Barrow Raiders	7 April, 14:00	Salford Community Pitches
3	London Broncos	48–0	Bradford Bulls	7 April, 15:30	Rosslyn Park F.C.

=== Standings ===
Group 1
Pos	Team	Pld	W	D	L	PF	PA	PD	Pts	Qualification
1	York Valkyrie	2	2	0	0	154	16	+138	4	Advance to knock-out stages
2	Featherstone Rovers	2	1	0	1	44	86	−42	2	Advance to knock-out stages
3	Sheffield Eagles	2	0	0	2	16	112	−96	0	

Group 2
Pos	Team	Pld	W	D	L	PF	PA	PD	Pts	Qualification
1	Wigan Warriors	3	3	0	0	132	22	+110	6	Advance to knock-out stages
2	Cardiff Demons	3	2	0	1	84	60	+24	4	Advance to knock-out stages
3	Barrow Raiders	3	1	0	2	80	42	+38	2	
4	Salford Red Devils	3	0	0	3	0	172	−172	0	

Group 3
Pos	Team	Pld	W	D	L	PF	PA	PD	Pts	Qualification
1	St Helens	3	3	0	0	170	6	+164	6	Advance to knock-out stages
2	Warrington Wolves	3	2	0	1	82	68	+14	4	Advance to knock-out stages
3	London Broncos	3	1	0	2	54	88	−34	2	
4	Bradford Bulls	3	0	0	3	4	148	−144	0	

Group 4
Pos	Team	Pld	W	D	L	PF	PA	PD	Pts	Qualification
1	Leeds Rhinos	3	3	0	0	196	14	+182	6	Advance to knock-out stages
2	Huddersfield Giants	3	2	0	1	120	60	+60	4	Advance to knock-out stages
3	Leigh Leopards	3	1	0	2	56	88	−32	2	
4	Hull KR	3	0	0	3	0	210	−210	0	

== Quarter-finals ==
The draw for the quarter-finals was made live on BBC Radio Merseyside, on 10 January following the draw for the group stage. Ties were played over the weekend of 13/14 April.

Challenge Cup quarter-final fixtures
Home	Score	Away	Match Information
Home	Score	Away	Date and Time	Venue	Referee	Attendance
Leeds Rhinos	70–10	Warrington Wolves	13 April, 12:00	Headingley
St Helens	74–0	Huddersfield Giants	13 April, 12:00	Crusaders Park, Thatto Heath
Wigan Warriors	44–4	Cardiff Demons	13 April, 14:00	Leigh Miners Rangers
York Valkyrie	70–0	Featherstone Rovers	14 April, 14:00	York Community Stadium

== Semi-finals ==
The draw for the semi-finals was made during the half time break at the men's quarter-final between St Helens and Warrington. The matches were played on 18 and 19 May, as part of double headers alongside the men's semi finals.

Challenge Cup semi-final fixtures
Home	Score	Away	Match Information
Home	Score	Away	Date and Time	Venue	Referee	Attendance
St Helens	32–2	York Valkyrie	18 May, 11:15am	Eco Power Stadium	A. Belafonte	11,163 (Note: attendance combined for both the men's, and women's game)
Wigan Warriors	20–34	Leeds Rhinos	19 May, 12:30pm	Totally Wicked Stadium	A. Williams

== Final ==
The final was played as part of a triple header, alongside the Men's Final, and the 2024 RFL 1895 Cup final.

Challenge Cup Final
Team 1	Score	Team 2	Match Information
Team 1	Score	Team 2	Date and Time	Venue	Referee	Attendance
St Helens	22–0	Leeds Rhinos	8 June 2024	Wembley Stadium	Aaron Moore	9,608
