= Molly Jones =

England international rugby league footballer

Personal information
- Born: 30 September 2004 (age 22) Skelmersdale, West Lancashire, England

Playing information
- Position: Centre
Club
| Years | Team | Pld | T | G | FG | P |
|---|---|---|---|---|---|---|
| 2022– | Wigan Warriors | 52 | 29 | 6 | 0 | 128 |
Representative
| Years | Team | Pld | T | G | FG | P |
| 2025– | England | 2 | 1 | 0 | 0 | 4 |
- Source: As of 24 October 2026

Molly Jones (born 30 September 2004) is an English rugby league footballer who plays as a centre for Wigan Warriors in the Women's Super League and England at international level.

== Club career ==
Jones was a member of the Rugby Football League's diploma in sporting excellence (DiSE) programme in 2021-22.

=== 2022 ===
Jones made her debut for Wigan Warriors against Huddersfield Giants in round 3 of the 2022 season, in an 18-30 win in Huddersfield. She played a total five games throughout the season.

=== 2023 ===
In 2023, Jones scored her first try for Wigan Warriors, crossing in a 20-38 Challenge Cup first round win over Cardiff Demons on April 23.

Jones played 15 times throughout the 2023 season, scoring once in 11 Betfred Women's Super League appearances, and scoring 4 times in 4 matches in the 2023 Women's Challenge Cup, where Wigan were knocked out in the semi finals by Leeds Rhinos, losing 16-4 at Headingley Stadium.

=== 2024 ===
Jones played just 9 times in the 2024 season, after injuring her collar bone in pre-season. Returning in round 6 of the 2024 season, Jones went on to score 2 tries in 8 matches.

=== 2025 ===
In round 3, Jones scored her first hatrick for the Wigan Warriors in a 12-34 victory over Leeds Rhinos at Headingley Stadium.

On 7 June, Jones played in the 2025 Women's Challenge Cup final, with Wigan defeating St Helens 42-6. Jones scored 6 times in 5 appearances in the competition, as Wigan claimed their maiden title.

Jones finished the season with 13 tries, and she was part of the Wigan Warriors side that completed the treble in the 2025 season, winning the League Leader's Shield, Super League, Women's Challenge Cup, and also winning the RFL Women's Nines.

On 5 October, Jones scored 2 tries in the Women's Super League Grand Final, helping Wigan to a 16-12 victory over St Helens.

== International career ==
On 9 August 2025, Jones made her first senior appearance for England against Wales. She scored a try in a 62-0 win.

== Club statistics ==
| Club | Season | Tier | App | T | G | DG | Pts |
|---|---|---|---|---|---|---|---|
| Wigan Warriors | 2022 | Super League | 5 | 0 | 0 | 0 | 0 |
| Wigan Warriors | 2023 | Super League | 15 | 4 | 6 | 0 | 16 |
| Wigan Warriors | 2024 | Super League | 9 | 3 | 0 | 0 | 12 |
| Wigan Warriors | 2025 | Super League | 19 | 19 | 0 | 0 | 76 |
| Wigan Warriors | 2026 | Super League | 4 | 3 | 0 | 0 | 12 |
| Wigan Warriors | 2027 | Super League | | | | | |
| Wigan Warriors | Total | | 48 | 29 | 6 | 0 | 128 |
| Career total | | | 48 | 29 | 6 | 0 | 128 |

== Honours ==
=== Wigan Warriors ===
- Super League
  - Winners (1): 2025
  - League Leader's Shield (1): 2025
- Challenge Cup
  - Winners (1): 2025
- RFL Women's Nines
  - Winners (2): 2024, 2025
