= 2025 Women's Challenge Cup final =

Rugby league match

2025 Women's Challenge Cup Final
St Helens	Wigan Warriors
6	42
	1	2	Total
STH	0	6	6
WIG	18	24	42
- Date: 7 June 2025
- Stadium: Wembley Stadium
- Location: London, United Kingdom
- Player of the Match: Grace Banks (Wigan)
- Referee: Aaron Moore
- Attendance: 8,810

Broadcast partners
- Broadcasters: BBC

The 2025 Women's Challenge Cup Final, was the 13th final of the Rugby Football League's Women's Challenge Cup knock-out competition. It was the third final at Wembley Stadium, and held on 7 June 2025, as part of a triple header, alongside the men's final and the 1895 Cup final

The final was contested by reigning champions St Helens, and Wigan Warriors.

== Background ==
The 2025 Women's Challenge Cup final was the first meeting between St Helens and Wigan Warriors in the competition final.

St Helens were four times defending champions of the Challenge Cup having won in 2021, 2022, and 2023, and 2024. They also won the tournament four times in a row between 2013 and 2016.

Wigan Warriors entered the final for the first time having previously reached the semi-finals on three occasions, 2018, 2023 and 2024, but losing to Leeds Rhinos each time.

== Route to the final ==
=== Wigan Warriors ===
Round	Opposition	Venue	Score
Group Stage	Barrow Raiders	Robin Park	84–0
Group Stage	London Broncos	Chiswick Rugby Club	44–0
Quarter-final	Cardiff Demons	Robin Park	96–0
Semi-final	Leeds Rhinos	York Community Stadium	44–14

=== St Helens ===
Round	Opposition	Venue	Score
Group Stage	Warrington Wolves	Totally Wicked Stadium	102–0
Group Stage	Cardiff Demons	Cardiff University	54–0
Quarter-final	London Broncos	Totally Wicked Stadium	78–0
Semi-final	York Valkyrie	Totally Wicked Stadium	10–6

== Pre-match ==
Before the game, the Year 7 School's Final was contested by Kingston upon Hull's Sirius Academy West and St Helens' Rainford High School.

Lily Day Scott sang the national anthem and Abide with Me ahead of the match, with entertainment throughout the day provided by Capital XTRA DJ Kennedy Taylor.

== Match details ==
Saturday, 7 June 2025
11:45am BST

St Helens	6–42	Wigan Warriors
Tries: Mottershead (50'); Goals: Gaskin (1/1) 51'		Tries: Williams (9′); Coleman (20′); Veivers (32′); Rowe (44′); Hunter (59′); Banks (71′); Davies (74′); Goals: Rowe (7/7); 10', 21', 33', 45', 60', 72', 75

Wembley Stadium, London
Attendance: 8,810
Referee: A. Moore
Touch judges: O. Salmon, L. Seal
Player of the Match: Grace Banks (Wigan)

Team details
St Helens		Position	Wigan Warriors
Name	Number	Position	Number	Name
Beri Salihi	1	FB	1	Grace Banks
Phoebe Hook	2	WG	2	Anna Davies
Luci McColm (substituted off) 48'	23	CE	3	Georgia Wilson
Amy Hardcastle	4	CE	4	Molly Jones
Dani McGifford	25	WG	5	Ellise Derbyshire
Zoe Harris (substituted off) 73'	6	SO	6	Jenna Foubister
Faye Gaskin	7	SH	7	Isabel Rowe
Darcy Stott (substituted off) 21', (substituted on) 58', (substituted off) 70'	16	PR	8	Mary Coleman
Caitlin Casey (substituted off) 23', (substituted on) 73'	17	HK	19	Remi Wilton (substituted off) 33', (substituted on) 57'
Chatelle Crowl (substituted off) 21', (substituted on) 46'	10	PF	20	Holly Speakman (substituted off) 19'
Shona Hoyle	11	SR	11	Eva Hunter
Emily Rudge	12	SR	10	Shaniah Power
Jodie Cunningham	13	LF	13	Megan Williams (substituted off) 25', (substituted on) 55'
Vicky Whitfield (substituted on) 21', (substituted off) 58', (substituted on) 70'	8	IN	9	Carys Marsh (substituted on) 33', (substituted off) 57'
Katie Mottershead (substituted on) 23'	9	IN	12	Vicky Molyneux (substituted on) 25', (substituted off) 55'
Georgia Sutherland (substituted on) 21', (substituted off) 46'	15	IN	14	Rachel Thompson (substituted on) 51'
Rachel Woosey (substituted on) 48'	18	IN	17	Emily Vievers (substituted on) 19', 32', (substituted off) 51'
Derek Hardman and Craig Richards		Coach		Denis Betts

== Post-match ==
Following the game, the men's 2025 Challenge Cup final was contested by Warrington Wolves and Hull Kingston Rovers. The 2025 RFL 1895 Cup final between Featherstone Rovers and York Knights took place following the men's final.

== See also ==
- 2025 Men's Challenge Cup final
