= 2023 Women's Challenge Cup =

Women's rugby league competition

- Duration: Group stage plus three knockout rounds
- Number of teams: 16
- Broadcast partners: BBC Sport
- Biggest home win: York Valkyrie 122–0 Hull KR (7 May 2023)
- Biggest away win: Castleford Tigers 0–106 St Helens (7 May 2023)

The 2023 Women's Challenge Cup (known for sponsorship reasons as the 2023 Betfred Women's Challenge Cup) was the 11th staging of the Rugby Football League's cup competition for women's rugby league clubs.

== Format ==
The competition used the same format as in 2022 with four groups of four competing in a single round robin with group winners and runners-up advancing to the knockout rounds. The group stage draw took place on 12 January.

Groups
Group 1	Group 2	Group 3	Group 4
Featherstone Rovers; Salford Red Devils; Cardiff Demons; Wigan Warriors	Huddersfield Giants; Bradford Bulls; Oulton Raidettes; Leeds Rhinos	Warrington Wolves; Castleford Tigers; London Broncos; St Helens	Barrow Raiders; Leigh Leopards; Hull Kingston Rovers; York Valkyrie

== Group stage ==
The fixture list for the group stage was published on 16 February 2023.

Challenge Cup group fixtures week 1
Group	Home	Score	Away	Match Information
Group	Home	Score	Away	Date and Time	Venue	Referee
1	Salford Red Devils	8–22	Featherstone Rovers	23 April, 12:00	AJ Bell Stadium	J. Pemberton
1	Cardiff Demons	20–38	Wigan Warriors	23 April, 14:00	Cardiff University Sports Fields	R. Apsee
2	Leeds Rhinos	72–0	Bradford Bulls	23 April, 13:00	Weetwood Sports Park	F. Lincoln
2	Oulton Raidettes	4–54	Huddersfield Giants	23 April, 14:00	Oulton Sports Pavilion	M. Mckelvey
3	London Broncos	0–76	St Helens	22 April, 14:00	The Rock, Roehampton	H. Winnard
3	Castleford Tigers	0–72	Warrington Wolves	23 April, 14:00	Mend-a-Hose Jungle	A. Rhodes
4	Barrow Raiders	4–44	York Valkyrie	23 April, 14:00	Craven Park, Barrow-in-Furness	J. Hughes
4	Hull Kingston Rovers	16–38	Leigh Leopards	23 April; 14:00	Craven Park, Hull	D. Frederick

Challenge Cup group fixtures week 2
Group	Home	Score	Away	Match Information
Group	Home	Score	Away	Date and Time	Venue	Referee
1	Featherstone Rovers	10–12	Wigan Warriors	7 May; 12:00	Post Office Road	C. Hughes
1	Salford Red Devils	8–12	Cardiff Demons	7 May; 13:00	Moor Lane	S. Houghton
2	Bradford Bulls	12–32	Huddersfield Giants	7 May; 14:00	Horsfall Stadium	M. Clayton
2	Oulton Raidettes	0–48 (Note: Match forfeited by Oulton as they were unable to raise a team. Under the RFL operational rules the match is recorded as a 48–0 win to the non-forfeiting team.)	Leeds Rhinos	—N/a
3	Castleford Tigers	0–106	St Helens	7 May; 14:00	Mend-a-Hose Jungle	D. Geddes
3	Warrington Wolves	64–10	London Broncos	7 May; 14:00	Victoria Park	O. Ireland
4	York Valkyrie	122–0	Hull Kingston Rovers	7 May; 12:00	York Community Stadium	B. Worsley
4	Leigh Leopards	30–22	Barrow Raiders	7 May; 14:00	Twist Lane	L. Flavell

Challenge Cup group fixtures week 3
Group	Home	Score	Away	Match Information
Group	Home	Score	Away	Date and Time	Venue	Referee
1	Cardiff Demons	36–18	Featherstone Rovers	21 May; 14:00	Cardiff University Sports Fields	R. Apsee
1	Wigan Warriors	60–0	Salford Red Devils	21 May; 14:00	Robin Park	S. Houghton
2	Huddersfield Giants	0–54	Leeds Rhinos	21 May; 14:00	Laund Hill	J. Covell-Wood
2	Bradford Bulls	38–6	Oulton Raidettes	21 May; 17:15	Odsal Stadium	A. Rhodes
3	London Broncos	40–4	Castleford Tigers	21 May; 14:00	The Rock, Roehampton
3	St Helens	38–4	Warrington Wolves	21 May; 14:00	Totally Wicked Stadium	L. Flavell
4	Hull Kingston Rovers	11–20	Barrow Raiders	21 May; 14:00	Craven Park, Hull
4	Leigh Leopards	0–54	York Valkyrie	21 May; 14:00	Twist Lane

=== Standings ===
Group 1
Pos	Team	Pld	W	D	L	PF	PA	PD	Pts	Qualification
1	Wigan Warriors	3	3	0	0	110	30	+80	6	Advance to knock-out stages
2	Cardiff Demons	3	2	0	1	68	64	+4	4	Advance to knock-out stages
3	Featherstone Rovers	3	1	0	2	50	56	−6	2	
4	Salford Red Devils	3	0	0	3	16	94	−78	0	

Group 2
Pos	Team	Pld	W	D	L	PF	PA	PD	Pts	Qualification
1	Leeds Rhinos	3	3	0	0	174	0	+174	6	Advance to knock-out stages
2	Huddersfield Giants	3	2	0	1	86	70	+16	4	Advance to knock-out stages
3	Bradford Bulls	3	1	0	2	50	110	−60	2	
4	Oulton Raidettes	3	0	0	3	10	140	−130	0	

Group 3
Pos	Team	Pld	W	D	L	PF	PA	PD	Pts	Qualification
1	St Helens	3	3	0	0	220	4	+216	6	Advance to knock-out stages
2	Warrington Wolves	3	2	0	1	140	48	+92	4	Advance to knock-out stages
3	London Broncos	3	1	0	2	50	144	−94	2	
4	Castleford Tigers	3	0	0	3	4	218	−214	0	

Group 4
Pos	Team	Pld	W	D	L	PF	PA	PD	Pts	Qualification
1	York Valkyrie	3	3	0	0	224	4	+220	6	Advance to knock-out stages
2	Leigh Leopards	3	2	0	1	68	96	−28	4	Advance to knock-out stages
3	Barrow Raiders	3	1	0	2	46	85	−39	2	
4	Hull Kingston Rovers	3	0	0	3	27	180	−153	0	

== Quarter-finals ==
The draw for the quarter-finals was made live on BBC Radio Five, on 26 May. Ties took place over the weekend of 17–18 June.

Challenge Cup quarter-final fixtures
Home	Score	Away	Match Information
Home	Score	Away	Date and Time	Venue	Referee	Attendance
Leeds Rhinos	54–0	Leigh Leopards	17 June, 13:00	Headingley Stadium
Wigan Warriors	46–10	Huddersfield Giants	18 June, 11:30	Robin Park Arena
St Helens	36–0	Warrington Wolves	18 June, 12:30	Totally Wicked Stadium
York Valkyrie	54–0	Cardiff Demons	18 June, 14:00	York Community Stadium

== Semi-finals ==
Ties took place over the weekend of 22–23 July, each being part of a double header with one of the men's semi-finals; St Helens v York was played with the Leigh v St Helens men's game and Wigan v Leeds was played with the Hull KR v Wigan men's game. Both of the women's matches were broadcast live on the BBC Sport website.

Challenge Cup semi-final fixtures
Team A	Score	Team B	Match Information
Team A	Score	Team B	Date and Time	Venue	Referee	Attendance
St Helens	17–16	York Valkyrie	22 July, 11:45	Halliwell Jones Stadium	A. Belafonte	12,113 (Note: attendance combined for both the women's and the men's games.)
Wigan Warriors	4–16	Leeds Rhinos	23 July, 14:15	Headingley	E. Burrow	10,926 (Note: attendance combined for both the women's and the men's games.)

== Final ==
On 12 August 2022, the RFL announced that the Women's Challenge Cup Final would make its Wembley debut, and be played as a double header with the men's final. The final was played on 12 August 2023.

Challenge Cup Final
Team 1	Score	Team 2	Match Information
Team 1	Score	Team 2	Date and Time	Venue	Referee	Attendance
Leeds Rhinos	8–22	St Helens	12 August 2023, 12:00	Wembley Stadium	J. Vella

== Broadcast matches ==
Round	Match	Date	Broadcast method
Final	Leeds Rhinos v St Helens	12 August 2023	Broadcast live on BBC Two

== See also ==
- 2023 Challenge Cup
