= 2022 Women's Challenge Cup =

Women's rugby league competition

- Duration: Group stage plus three knockout rounds
- Number of teams: 16
- Broadcast partners: BBC Sport
- Winners: St Helens
- Runners-up: Leeds Rhinos
- Biggest home win: Leeds Rhinos 92–0 Leigh Miners Rangers (3 April 2022)
- Biggest away win: Hull FC 0–114 Huddersfield Giants (3 April 2022)

The 2022 Women's Challenge Cup (sponsored as the 2022 Betfred Women's Challenge Cup) was the 10th staging of the Rugby Football League's cup competition for women's rugby league clubs. The competition was won by St Helens who beat Leeds Rhinos 18–8 in the final at Elland Road on 7 May.

== Format ==
The competition has a different format from previous years. Instead of being a straight knockout tournament, the first stage was played using a single round-robin format with the top two teams from four groups advancing to the quarter-final stage, at which point knockout format was resumed.

Entry was limited to the 12 teams of the Women's Super League plus three Championship teams; Hull FC, Oulton Raidettes and Widnes Vikings; together with the Army women's team. Each team was seeded into one of four pots with one team from each pot being drawn into each group.

Seeding pots for group stage draw
Pot 1	Pot 2	Pot 3	Pot 4
Castleford Tigers; Leeds Rhinos; St Helens; York City Knights	Featherstone Rovers; Huddersfield Giants; Warrington Wolves; Wigan Warriors	Barrow Raiders; Bradford Bulls; Leigh Miners Rangers; Wakefield Trinity	British Army; Hull FC; Oulton Raidettes; Widnes Vikings

Groups
Group A	Group B	Group C	Group D
St Helens; Warrington Wolves; Barrow Raiders; British Army	Leeds Rhinos; Huddersfield Giants; Leigh Miners Rangers; Hull FC	York City Knights; Wigan Warriors; Bradford Bulls; Widnes Vikings	Castleford Tigers; Wakefield Trinity; Featherstone Rovers; Oulton Raidettes

On 6 March 2022 Widnes Vikings withdrew from the competition and were replaced by another Championship side, Dewsbury Moor.

== Group stage ==
The draw for the group stages was made on 7 December at Elland Road, Leeds. Making the draw were footballers Jermaine Beckford and Gemma Bonner.

=== Group A ===
Group A fixtures
Home	Score	Away	Match Information
Home	Score	Away	Date and Time	Venue	Referee
Barrow Raiders	0–68	St Helens	13 March 2022, 14:00	Craven Park
British Army	8–50	Warrington Wolves	13 March 2022, 14:00	Aldershot Military Stadium
St Helens	88–0	British Army	27 March 2022, 14:00	Totally Wicked Stadium
Warrington Wolves	36–16	Barrow Raiders	27 March 2022, 14:00	Halliwell Jones Stadium
Warrington Wolves	0–54	St Helens	3 April 2022, 14:00	Halliwell Jones Stadium
Barrow Raiders	38–0	British Army	3 April 2022, 14:00	Craven Park

Pos	Team	Pld	W	D	L	PF	PA	PD	Pts	Qualification
1	St Helens	3	3	0	0	210	0	+210	6	Advance to quarter-finals with home advantage
2	Warrington Wolves	3	2	0	1	86	78	+8	4	Advance to quarter-finals
3	Barrow Raiders	3	1	0	2	54	104	−50	2	
4	British Army	3	0	0	3	8	176	−168	0	

=== Group B ===
Group B fixtures
Home	Score	Away	Match Information
Home	Score	Away	Date and Time	Venue	Referee
Huddersfield Giants	8–38	Leeds Rhinos	12 March 2022, 12:00	John Smiths Stadium
Leigh Miners Rangers	72–0	Hull FC	13 March 2022, 14:00	Twist Lane
Hull FC	0–48 (Note: Hull forfeited the game after being unable to raise a team. Under the RFL operational rules, the match was awarded to Leeds as a 48–0 win.)	Leeds Rhinos	—N/a
Leigh Miners Rangers	6–46	Huddersfield Giants	27 March 2022, 14:00	Twist Lane
Leeds Rhinos	92–0	Leigh Miners Rangers	3 April 2022, 14:00	Headingley
Hull FC	0–114	Huddersfield Giants	3 April 2022, 14:00	MKM Stadium

Pos	Team	Pld	W	D	L	PF	PA	PD	Pts	Qualification
1	Leeds Rhinos	3	3	0	0	178	8	+170	6	Advance to quarter-finals with home advantage
2	Huddersfield Giants	3	2	0	1	168	44	+124	4	Advance to quarter-finals
3	Leigh Miners Rangers	3	1	0	2	78	138	−60	2	
4	Hull FC	3	0	0	3	0	234	−234	0	

=== Group C ===
Group C fixtures
Home	Score	Away	Match Information
Home	Score	Away	Date and Time	Venue	Referee
Dewsbury Moor	0–78	York City Knights	13 March 2022, 14:00	Dewsbury Moor Sports Club
Bradford Bulls	6–44	Wigan Warriors	13 March 2022, 17:00	Horsfall Stadium
York City Knights	46–0	Wigan Warriors	20 March 2022, 12:00	York Community Stadium
Wigan Warriors	62–0	Dewsbury Moor	27 March 2022, 12:00	Robin Park Arena
Bradford Bulls	4–76	York City Knights	27 March 2022, 14:00	Odsal Stadium
Dewsbury Moor	4–22	Bradford Bulls	3 April 2022, 14:00

Pos	Team	Pld	W	D	L	PF	PA	PD	Pts	Qualification
1	York City Knights	3	3	0	0	200	4	+196	6	Advance to quarter-finals with home advantage
2	Wigan Warriors	3	2	0	1	106	52	+54	4	Advance to quarter-finals
3	Bradford Bulls	3	1	0	2	32	124	−92	2	
4	Dewsbury Moor	3	0	0	3	4	162	−158	0	

=== Group D ===
Group D fixtures
Home	Score	Away	Match Information
Home	Score	Away	Date and Time	Venue	Referee
Castleford Tigers	10–32	Wakefield Trinity	13 March 2022, 14:00	The Mend-A-Hose Jungle
Oulton Raidettes	10–30	Featherstone Rovers	13 March 2022, 14:00
Oulton Raidettes	40–0	Castleford Tigers	27 March 2022, 14:00
Wakefield Trinity	0–32	Featherstone Rovers	27 March 2022, 14:00	Belle Vue
Featherstone Rovers	86–0	Castleford Tigers	3 April 2022, 14:00	Post Office Road
Wakefield Trinity	12–14	Oulton Raidettes	3 April 2022, 14:00	Belle Vue

Pos	Team	Pld	W	D	L	PF	PA	PD	Pts	Qualification
1	Featherstone Rovers	3	3	0	0	148	10	+138	6	Advance to quarter-finals with home advantage
2	Oulton Raidettes	3	2	0	1	64	42	+22	4	Advance to quarter-finals
3	Wakefield Trinity	3	1	0	2	44	56	−12	2	
4	Castleford Tigers	3	0	0	3	10	158	−148	0	

== Quarter-finals ==
The quarter-finals are scheduled for the weekend of 9/10 April. The teams topping each group will have home advantage in the quarter-finals.

Quarter-finals
Home	Score	Away	Match Information
Home	Score	Away	Date and Time	Venue	Referee
St Helens	24–0	Huddersfield Giants	10 April 2022, 14:00	Totally Wicked Stadium
Leeds Rhinos	40–0	Warrington Wolves	10 April 2022, 14:00	Headingley Rugby Stadium
York City Knights	92–2	Oulton Raidettes	10 April 2022, 14:00	York Community Stadium
Featherstone Rovers	12–10	Wigan Warriors	10 April 2022, 18:00	Post Office Road

== Semi-finals ==
The draw for the semi-finals was made on 10 April with the matches played on 24 April as a double header at Warrington's Halliwell Jones Stadium.

Team 1	Score	Team 2	Match Information
Team 1	Score	Team 2	Date and Time	Venue	Referee
York City Knights	24–26	Leeds Rhinos	24 April 2022, 14:30	Halliwell Jones Stadium
St Helens	82–0	Featherstone Rovers	24 April 2022, 17:30	Halliwell Jones Stadium

== Final ==
The final was played at Elland Road, Leeds on Saturday 7 May 2022. The match formed part of a triple-header with the semi-finals of the men's Challenge Cup. The attendance of 5,888 was a new record attendance for a women's rugby league match in Great Britain.

=== Details ===
7 May 2022
12:00 BST (UTC+01:00)

St Helens	18 – 8	Leeds Rhinos
Tries: Burke, Partington (2), Cunningham; Goals: Stott (1/4)	report	Tries: Hornby; Goals: Winfield-Hill (2/3)

Elland Road, Leeds
Attendance: 5,888
Referee: Liam Rush
Player of the Match: Zoe Hornby (Leeds)

Team details
St Helens		Position	Leeds Rhinos
Name	Number	Position	Number	Name
Rebecca Rotherham	1	FB	4	Fran Goldthorp
Ebony Partington	17	WG	17	Tasha Gaines
Carrie Roberts	3	CE	13	Hannah Butcher
Amy Hardcastle	4	CE	1	Caitlin Beevers
Leah Burke	5	WG	18	Sam Hulme
Zoe Harris	6	SO	6	Georgia Roche
Beth Stott	15	SH	7	Courtney Winfield-Hill
Isabelle Rudge	20	PR	8	Aimee Staveley
Tara Jones	9	HK	9	Keara Bennett
Chantelle Prowl	10	PF	15	Danielle Anderson
Paige Travis	11	SR	11	Chloe Kerrigan
Naomi Williams	14	SR	12	Elycia Watson
Jodie Cunningham	13	LF	15	Zoe Hornby
Vicky Whitfield	8	IN	20	Emma Lumley
Alice Sandham	21	IN	14	Shannon Lacey
Emily Rudge	12	IN	16	Orla McCallion
Rachael Woosey	19	IN	26	Alex Barnes
Derek Hardman		Coach		Lois Forsell

== Broadcast matches ==
Round	Match	Date	Broadcast method
Group stage match, week 1	Barrow Raiders v St Helens	12 March 2022	Broadcast live on BBC Red Button
Group stage match, week 2	York City Knights v Wigan Warriors	20 March 2022	Broadcast live on Our League
Group stage match, week 3	Wakefield Trinity v Oulton Raidettes	3 April 2022	Broadcast live on Our League
Quarter-final	Featherstone Rovers v Wigan Warriors	10 April 2022	Broadcast live on Our League
Semi-final	York City Knights v Leeds Rhinos	24 April 2022	Broadcast live on BBC Red Button
Semi-final	St Helens v Featherstone Rovers	24 April 2022	Broadcast live on BBC Red Button
Final	St Helens v Leeds Rhinos	7 May 2022	Broadcast live on BBC Two

== See also ==
- 2022 Men's Challenge Cup
