= Leah Burke =

England international rugby league footballer

Personal information
- Born: 11 June 1998 (age 27) Leigh, Lancashire, England

Playing information
- Position: Wing
Club
Years	Team	Pld	T	G	FG	P
2018–	St Helens	59	63	0	0	252
Representative
Years	Team	Pld	T	G	FG	P
2019–	England	6	6	0	0	24
- Source: As of 27 November 2025

Leah Burke (born 11 June 1998) is an England international rugby league footballer who plays at domestic level for St Helens. Burke plays on the wing.

Born in Leigh, Lancashire Burke was an artistic gymnast for many years competing in several English championships.

Diagnosed with a stress fracture in her lower back when she was 16, Burke retired from gymnastics. At 18 Burke went to Leeds Beckett University and started playing rugby union. At the suggestion of her sister, Rhianna, Burke went along to a trial rugby league session at St Helens and was signed by the club. Burke made her debut for St Helens in the 2018 Women's Super League. Since then Burke has been a regular in the St Helens side making 53 appearances by the end of the 2022 Women's Super League season and scoring 50 tries.

In 2019 Burke was selected for the England team and made her international debut against Papua New Guinea in November 2019. Burke's second international was in June 2022 against France. Burke was also chosen for the England squad for the 2019 Rugby League World Cup 9s scoring a try in England's first group game versus Papua New Guinea.

Burke was chosen for the England squad for the 2021 Women's Rugby League World Cup and scored six tries in England's four matches, including a hat-trick against Papua New Guinea.

In June 2023 Burke suffered an anterior cruciate ligament injury that ended her season.
