= Vicky Molyneux =

England international rugby league player

Personal information
- Full name: Victoria Molyneux
- Born: 3 February 1988 (age 38) Rochdale, Greater Manchester, England

Playing information
- Position: Loose forward
Club
Years	Team	Pld	T	G	FG	P
2019–25	Wigan Warriors	27	9	0	0	36
Representative
Years	Team	Pld	T	G	FG	P
2007; 2021–23	England	8	0	0	0	0

Vicky Molyneux (born 3 February 1988) is an English former rugby league footballer who last represented England internationally and last played at domestic level for Wigan Warriors.

Molyneux is from Rochdale and is the daughter of former Wigan player Jimmy Molyneux. She began playing playing rugby league at a for a local boys team aged 10.

Her first open-age girls club was Hillside Hawks. During this time she was selected for the inaugural England side, gaining England heritage no. 3 when making her international debut against France in July 2007.

Molyneux at some point, took time away from the sport, where she had a daughter named Molly.

Molyneux returned to the sport in 2019, signing for Women's Super League side Wigan Warriors. The same year Molyneux was captain of the Great Britain Teachers rugby league team.

2021 saw Molyneux named vice captain for Wigan and saw her recalled to the England squad, 14 years after her previous appearance, to play against Wales. A further cap came in the 2021 game against France. Molyneux was selected for England for the 2021 Women's Rugby League World Cup and played in three of England's four matches being named Player of the Match in the 54–4 win over the Canada Ravens Molyneux was one of four England players named in the World Cup Women's Team of the Tournament.

Two further England caps followed in 2023. In November 2023 Molyneux announced her retirement from international rugby. In announcing her international retirement Molyneux became the last member of the inaugural England team to retire.

In 2023, Molyneux became the first woman inducted into the Wigan Warriors Hall of Fame.

2024 saw Molyneux named Wigan captain under new head coach Denis Betts. The following year she won her first piece of 13 a side silverware with the club, winning the 2025 Women's Challenge Cup.

On 24 September 2025 Molyneux announced that she would retire at the end of the season.

Molyneux finished here career on 5 October as the treble winning captain of Wigan following a 2025 Super League Grand Final victory over St Helens, after beating them in the Challenge Cup final earlier in the year, and lifting the League Leaders' Shield.
