= RFL Women's Super League Grand Final =

Women's Super League Grand Final
- Current season or competition: 2026 RFL Women's Super League
- Sport: Rugby league
- Inaugural season: 2017
- Country: England
- Holders: York Valkyrie (2026)
- Most titles: York Valkyrie (3 titles)
- Broadcast partner: BBC, Sky Sports
- Related competition: RFL Women's Super League

The Women's Super League Grand Final is the championship-deciding game of rugby league's RFL Women's Super League competition.

== History ==
After the formation of the Women's Super League in 2017 it was announced that the title would be decided by a playoff series and Grand Final as the men's competition does as well. The first two Grand Finals were held at the Manchester Regional Arena as double headers with the women's championship final, on the same day and before the men's Grand Final. For 2019 it was announced Headingley Stadium would host the final. However a late date change meant a change of venue as Headingley was unavailable for the new date and the 2019 grand final was played at the Totally Wicked Stadium instead.

The 2021 final was played at Headingley as a double header preceded by the Shield final. In 2022, the final was played at the Totally Wicked Stadium as a double header with the Shield Final. The 2023 final was played at York Community Stadium as a double header preceded by the Group 2 promotion play-off final. The 2024 final was played at the Totally Wicked Stadium as a double header preceded by the promotion/relegation play-off between the National Championship winner and the bottom team in the Super League.

== Finals ==
Year	Winners	Score	Runner-up	Venue	Attendance	Ref
2017	Bradford Bulls	36–6	Featherstone Rovers	Manchester Regional Arena		
2018	Wigan Warriors	18–16	Leeds Rhinos	Manchester Regional Arena	1,189	
2019	Leeds Rhinos	20–12	Castleford Tigers	Totally Wicked Stadium	1,673	
2020	Cancelled due to the COVID-19 pandemic					
2021	St Helens	28–0	Leeds Rhinos	Headingley	4,235	
2022	Leeds Rhinos	12–4	York City Knights	Totally Wicked Stadium	2,151	
2023	York Valkyrie	16–6	Leeds Rhinos	York Community Stadium	4,547	
2024	York Valkyrie	18–8	St Helens	Totally Wicked Stadium	4,813	
2025	Wigan Warriors	16–12	St Helens	Brick Community Stadium	5,018	
2026	York Valkyrie	8–6	Wigan Warriors	Brick Community Stadium		

== See also ==
- NRL Women's Grand Final
