= 2025 Women's Challenge Cup =

Women's rugby league competition

- Duration: Group stage plus three knockout rounds
- Number of teams: 12
- Winners: Wigan Warriors
- Runners-up: St Helens
- Biggest home win: St Helens 102–0 Warrington Wolves (12 April)
- Biggest away win: Sheffield Eagles 0–104 Leeds Rhinos (12 April)
- Top point-scorer(s): Ruby Walker (Leeds Rhinos) (36)
- Top try-scorer(s): Ebony Stead (Leeds Rhinos) (5)

The 2025 Women's Challenge Cup (sponsored as the Betfred Women's Challenge Cup) was the 13th staging of the Rugby Football League's cup competition for women's rugby league clubs. Wigan Warriors defeated St Helens 42–6 in the final to claim their first title.

== Format ==
The competition used a slightly different format from 2024. Although the group stage plus knockout rounds format was retained, the number of teams in the competition was reduced from 16 to 12.

The group stage saw four groups of three competing in a single round robin with the group matches played over three consecutive weekends in April 2025. The group winners and runners-up advanced to the knockout rounds. The quarter-finals were played on the last weekend in April. The semi-finals were double headers with the semi-finals of the men's tournament on the weekend of 10/11 May 2025, and the final was played at Wembley Stadium, London on 7 June 2025 alongside the finals of the men's competition and the 1895 Cup.

St Helens, winners in 2024, were seeded together with Leeds Rhinos, Wigan Warriors and York Valkyrie. These four, pool 2, were in different groups in the group stage. The other eight teams formed pool 1 with two being drawn in each group.

Seeding pots for group stage draw
Pool 1	Pool 2
Barrow Raiders; Cardiff Demons; Featherstone Rovers; Huddersfield Giants; Leigh Leopards; London Broncos; Sheffield Eagles; Warrington Wolves	Leeds Rhinos; St Helens; Wigan Warriors; York Valkyrie

The draw for the group stages was made on 14 January.

The groups were drawn as follows:

Groups
Group A	Group B	Group C	Group D
Cardiff Demons; St Helens; Warrington Wolves	Featherstone Rovers; Huddersfield Giants; York Valkyrie	Leeds Rhinos; Leigh Leopards; Sheffield Eagles	Barrow Raiders; London Broncos; Wigan Warriors

== Standings ==
=== Group A ===
Pos	Team	Pld	W	D	L	PF	PA	PD	Pts	Qualification
1	St Helens	2	2	0	0	156	0	+156	4	Advance to knock-out stages
2	Cardiff Demons	2	1	0	1	42	68	−26	2	Advance to knock-out stages
3	Warrington Wolves	2	0	0	2	14	144	−130	0	

=== Group B ===
Pos	Team	Pld	W	D	L	PF	PA	PD	Pts	Qualification
1	York Valkyrie	2	2	0	0	110	6	+104	4	Advance to knock-out stages
2	Huddersfield Giants	2	1	0	1	36	64	−28	2	Advance to knock-out stages
3	Featherstone Rovers	2	0	0	2	14	90	−76	0	

=== Group C ===
Pos	Team	Pld	W	D	L	PF	PA	PD	Pts	Qualification
1	Leeds Rhinos	2	2	0	0	150	4	+146	4	Advance to knock-out stages
2	Leigh Leopards	2	1	0	1	52	46	+6	2	Advance to knock-out stages
3	Sheffield Eagles	2	0	0	2	0	152	−152	0	

=== Group D ===
Pos	Team	Pld	W	D	L	PF	PA	PD	Pts	Qualification
1	Wigan Warriors	2	2	0	0	128	0	+128	4	Advance to knock-out stages
2	London Broncos	2	1	0	1	22	58	−36	2	Advance to knock-out stages
3	Barrow Raiders	2	0	0	2	14	106	−92	0	

== Group stage ==
The fixture list for the group stage was announced on 10 March 2025.

Group stage: week one
Group	Home	Score	Away	Match Information
Group	Home	Score	Away	Date and Time	Venue	Referee	Attendance
C	Leeds Rhinos	46–4	Leigh Leopards	5 April, 13:00	Headingley Stadium	S. Jenkinson
A	Warrington Wolves	14–42	Cardiff Demons	6 April, 14:00	Victoria Park	M. McKelvey
D	Wigan Warriors	84–0	Barrow Raiders	6 April, 14:00	Robin Park	A. Billington
B	Huddersfield Giants	0–56	York Valkyrie	6 April, 15:00	Laund Hill	A. Sweet

Group stage: week two
Group	Home	Score	Away	Match Information
Group	Home	Score	Away	Date and Time	Venue	Referee	Attendance
C	Sheffield Eagles	0–104 (Note: The referee ended the match early, after 60 minutes, due to injuries suffered by Sheffield, which left them with only nine available players.)	Leeds Rhinos	12 April, 12:30	Steel City Stadium	O. Salmon
A	St Helens	102–0	Warrington Wolves	12 April, 15:30	Totally Wicked Stadium	L. Bland
B	York Valkyrie	54–6	Featherstone Rovers	13 April, 12:00	York Community Stadium	A. Belafonte
D	London Broncos	0–44	Wigan Warriors	13 April, 14;00	Chiswick Rugby Club	Tyler Topping

Group stage: week three
Group	Home	Score	Away	Match Information
Group	Home	Score	Away	Date and Time	Venue	Referee	Attendance
B	Featherstone Rovers	8–36	Huddersfield Giants	18 April, 20:00	Post Office Road	N. Horton
A	Cardiff Demons	0–54	St Helens	19 April, 14:30	Cardiff University	L. Breheny
D	Barrow Raiders	14–22	London Broncos	20 April, 12:00	Craven Park	L. Seal
C	Leigh Leopards	48–0 (Note: Match forfeited by Sheffield Eagles. Awarded as a 48–0 win to Leigh Leopards.)	Sheffield Eagles	—N/a

== Quarter-finals ==
The quarter-finals took place over the weekend of 26/27 April.

Challenge Cup quarter-final fixtures
Home	Score	Away	Match Information
Home	Score	Away	Date and Time	Venue	Referee	Attendance
St Helens	78–0	London Broncos	26 April, 12:00	Totally Wicked Stadium	F. Lincoln
Leeds Rhinos	38–18	Huddersfield Giants	27 April, 12:00	Headingley Stadium	L. Seal
York Valkyrie	52–0	Leigh Leopards	27 April, 12:00	York Community Stadium	S. Jenkinson
Wigan Warriors	96–0	Cardiff Demons	27 April, 13:00	Robin Park	A. Billington

== Semi-finals ==
The semi-finals were played over the weekend of 10/11 May and were double-headers with the men's semi-finals. Both matches were broadcast live on the BBC iPlayer.

Challenge Cup semi-final fixtures
Home	Score	Away	Match Information
Home	Score	Away	Date and Time	Venue	Referee	Attendance
Leeds Rhinos	14–44	Wigan Warriors	10 May 2025, 12:00	York Community Stadium	T. Jones
York Valkyrie	6–10	St Helens	11 May 2025, 13:45	Totally Wicked Stadium	A. Williams

== Final ==
The final took place on Saturday 7 June 2025, as part of a triple header, alongside the Men's final, and the 1895 Cup final.

Challenge Cup Final
Home	Score	Away	Match Information
Home	Score	Away	Date and Time	Venue	Referee	Attendance
St Helens	6–42	Wigan Warriors	7 June; 11:45	Wembley Stadium	A. Moore	8,810
