= RFL Women's Nines =

Rugby competition

- Sport: Rugby league nines
- Founded: 30 March 2022; 4 years ago
- No. of teams: 16 (Qualifying); 6 (Finals)
- Country: England; Wales
- Most recent champions: Leeds Rhinos (2nd title)
- Most titles: Wigan Warriors; Leeds Rhinos (2)

The RFL Women's Nines is a rugby league nines competition played as a pre season tournament ahead of the RFL Women's Super League. It is the first Women's Rugby League title in Europe to award prize money.

== 2022 ==
On 30 March, the RFL announced that the inaugural RFL Women's Nines tournament would take place on 1 May. The competition saw teams from across RFL Women's Super League and RFL Women's Super League South, as well as selected invitational teams compete for six spaces in the final competition. The qualifiers saw 20 teams play in five groups of four with each group leader advancing to the final stage along with one wildcard team. Catalans Dragons, Leeds Rhinos, Huddersfield Giants, St Helens, and York City Knights were the five teams to advance as group leaders. Warrington Wolves were granted a wildcard entry as the best placed runner-up having drawn with St Helens and finished behind them on points difference.

2022 Groups
Pos	Group A	Group B	Group C	Group D	Group E
1	St Helens (Q)	Leeds Rhinos (Q)	Catalans Dragons (Q)	Huddersfield Giants (Q)	York City Knights (Q)
2	Warrington Wolves (W)	London Broncos	Wigan Warriors	Salford Red Devils	Cardiff Demons
3	Barrow Raiders	Featherstone Rovers	Wakefield Trinity	Oulton Raidettes	Bradford Bulls
4	Bristol Golden Ferns	Warrington Lunas	Hull FC	Castleford Tigers	Leigh Miners Rangers

Q Qualified W Wildcard

=== Finals ===
The finals took places at the AJ Bell Stadium in Salford on 24 July. The tournament was won by the York City Knights. Results are as follows:

Group A

- St Helens 12–4 Huddersfield Giants
- Leeds Rhinos 29–6 Huddersfield Giants
- Leeds Rhinos 26–0 St Helens

Group B

- York City Knights 16–8 Catalans Dragons
- Catalans Dragons 22–7 Warrington Wolves
- York City Knights 37–0 Warrington Wolves

Semi-finals

- Leeds Rhinos 23–7 Catalans Dragons
- York City Knights 26–0 St Helens

Final

- York City Knights 7–0 Leeds Rhinos

== 2023 ==
The 2023 RFL Women's Nines competition began on 14 May and was once again held at Victoria Park, Warrington and saw 20 teams compete for the six places in the final tournament.

2023 Groups
Pos	Group One	Group Two	Group Three	Group Four	Group Five
1	Warrington Wolves (Q)	Leeds Rhinos (Q)	St Helens (Q)	Wigan Warriors (Q)	York Valkyrie (Q)
2	Huddersfield Giants	Cardiff Demons (W)	Hull Kingston Rovers	Leigh Leopards	Barrow Raiders
3	Leamington Royals	Salford Red Devils	Featherstone Rovers	London Broncos	Hull FC
4	Oldham	Bradford Bulls	Newcastle Thunder	Castleford Tigers	Workington Town

Q Qualified W Wildcard

=== Finals ===
The 2023 finals took places on 24 June at the AJ Bell Stadium in Salford for a second time and was contested by the six teams which qualified during the May event held in Warrington. Leeds Rhinos won the tournament for the first time. Results are as follows:

Group A

- Leeds Rhinos 36–0 Warrington Wolves
- Wigan Warriors 14–14 Leeds Rhinos
- Warrington Wolves 0–33 Wigan Warriors

Group B

- York Valkyrie 11–10 St Helens
- Cardiff Demons 0–23 York Valkyrie
- St Helens 16–8 Cardiff Demons

Semi-finals

- Leeds Rhinos 14–4 St Helens
- York Valkyrie 4–12 Wigan Warriors

Final

- Leeds Rhinos 21–8 Wigan Warriors

== 2024 ==
The 2024 RFL Women's Nines competition began on 5 May and was held at Victoria Park, Warrington. All eight Super League teams took part along with a selection of teams from the regional Championships and Widnes Vikings of League 1. The 16 teams were divided in to four groups to compete for the six places (four group winners and two wildcards) in the final tournament. Leeds Rhinos and Huddersfield Giants were named as the wildcard entries for the finals day.

2024 Groups
Pos	Group 1	Group 2	Group 3	Group 4
1	York Valkyrie (Q)	St Helens (Q)	Cardiff Demons (Q)	Wigan Warriors (Q)
2	Warrington Wolves	Leeds Rhinos (W)	Barrow Raiders	Huddersfield Giants (W)
3	Leigh Leopards	Leamington Royals (‡)	Featherstone Rovers (‡)	London Broncos
4	Widnes Vikings	Telford Raiders (‡)	Hull Kingston Rovers (‡)	Salford Red Devils

Q Qualified W Wildcard ‡ Group position unknown (Note: Standings incomplete as results for Telford/Leamington and Featherstone/Hull KR are missing from reports)

=== Finals ===
The 2024 finals took place on 28 July at Craven Park in Hull, and was contested by the six teams which qualified during the May event held in Warrington. Wigan Warriors won the tournament for the first time.

Group A

- York Valkyrie 8–17 Huddersfield Giants
- Wigan Warriors 26–8 York Valkyrie
- Huddersfield Giants 0–31 Wigan Warriors

Group B

- Leeds Rhinos 12–4 St Helens
- Cardiff Demons 0–23 Leeds Rhinos
- St Helens 9–17 Cardiff Demons

Semi-finals

- Huddersfield Giants 0–12 Leeds Rhinos
- Wigan Warriors 40–0 Cardiff Demons

Final

- Wigan Warriors 21–0 Leeds Rhinos

== 2025 ==
The 2025 RFL Women's Nines competition was held at West Park Leeds RUFC in Bramhope, Leeds, with the whole tournament being played over one day on 5 July. Scotland, who had been invited to take part in the 2025 event, would have become the first national team to compete in the tournament, but they withdrew from the competition as did Northumbria University and North Wales Crusaders. Wigan Warriors went unbeaten throughout the tournament to retain the title.

2025 Groups
Pos	Group A	Group B	Group C	Group D
1	Leeds Rhinos (Q)	Huddersfield Giants (Q)	Wigan Warriors (Q)	York Valkyrie (Q)
2	Swinton Lionesses (Q)	St Helens (Q)	Barrow Raiders (Q)	Cardiff Demons (Q)
3	Warrington Wolves (C)	London Broncos (C)	Hull Kingston Rovers (C)	Leigh Leopards (C)
4	—N/a (Note: Three teams withdrew from the 2025 tournament: Group A: North Wales Crusaders and Scotland, Group C: Northumbria University)	Leamington Royals (S)	—N/a	Wakefield Trinity (S)

Q Qualified for Championship C Cup S Shield

=== Finals ===
Championship quarter-finals

- St Helens 0–31 Wigan Warriors
- Huddersfield Giants 22–0 Barrow Raiders
- Cardiff Demons 0–7 Swinton Lionesses
- York Valkyrie 8–11 Leeds Rhinos

Championship semi-finals

- Huddersfield Giants 8–4 Leeds Rhinos
- Wigan Warriors 25–0 Swinton Lionesses

Championship final

- Wigan Warriors 12–0 Huddersfield Giants

Cup semi-finals

- Hull Kingston Rovers 0–10 London Broncos
- Warrington Wolves 0–21 Leigh Leopards

Cup final

- Leigh Leopards 15–0 London Broncos

Shield final

- Wakefield Trinity 19–0 Leamington Royals

== 2026 ==
On 5 February 2026, the RFL confirmed the 2026 competition would take place on 2 May at Edge Hill University, Ormskirk, the format of which would include two separate competitions: a Challenge Grade and a Community Grade.

There were nine teams in the Challenge Grade competition, as Widnes Vikings withdrew the week before the tournament. In the Community Grade, there were eight teams including two representing Rochdale Hornets.

- Challenge Grade
  1. Manchester Swinton Lionesses
  2. York Valkyrie
  3. Wakefield Trinity
  4. Leeds Rhinos
  5. ~~Widnes Vikings~~
  6. Huddersfield Giants
  7. Wigan Warriors
  8. St Helens
  9. London Broncos
  10. Featherstone Rovers
- Community Grade
  1. Leamington Royals
  2. Wigan St Patricks
  3. Rochdale Hornets (A)
  4. Halton Farnworth Hornets
  5. Thatto Heath Crusaders
  6. Bradford Bulls Development
  7. University of Leeds
  8. Rochdale Hornets (B)

=== Finals ===
Challenge Grade championship final

- Leeds Rhinos 16–8 Manchester Swinton Lionesses

Challenge Grade shield final

- Wigan Warriors 12–8 York Valkyrie

Community Grade championship final

- Rochdale Hornets (A) 8–4 Bradford Bulls Development

Community Grade shield final

- Wigan St Patricks 6–4 Thatto Heath Crusaders
