= 2018 RFL Women's Super League =

2018 Women's Super League
- Duration: 14 rounds
- Teams: 7
- Matches played: 42
- Points scored: 1,942
- Champions: Wigan Warriors Women
- League Leaders Shield: Leeds Rhinos Women
- Woman of Steel: Georgia Roche

The 2018 RFL Women's Super League was the second season of the rugby league Women's Super League for female players in clubs affiliated to the Rugby Football League in England. The grand final was won by Wigan Warriors Women, who beat Leeds Rhinos Women 18–16 at the Grand Final at the Manchester Regional Arena. Wigan finished second to League Leaders Shield winners Leeds in the regular season.

The defending champions, Bradford Bulls Women, failed to make the play-offs in 2018.

At the end of the regular season, the top four teams met in the play-off semi-finals. First placed Leeds beat fourth placed Castleford, while second placed Wigan beat St Helens who finished third. The winners met in the Grand Final at the Manchester Regional Arena on 13 October.

== Teams ==
Locations of teams in Northern England

Two of the seven teams were newly formed for this season, one was renamed and the other four had been in existence before 2018.

Colours	Club	Location	Notes
	Bradford Bulls Women	Bradford, West Yorkshire	inaugural champions in 2017.
	Castleford Tigers Women	Castleford, West Yorkshire	
	Featherstone Rovers Ladies	Featherstone, West Yorkshire	
	Leeds Rhinos Women	Leeds, West Yorkshire	Newly formed for 2018.
	St Helens R.F.C. Women	St Helens, Merseyside	Previously known as Thatto Heath Ladies.
	Wigan Warriors Women	Wigan, Greater Manchester	Newly formed for 2018.
	York City Knights Ladies	York, North Yorkshire	

== Fixtures and results ==
The fixtures are organised into 14 rounds, with each team only having 12 fixtures this means that every team will have a bye in two rounds of the competition.

=== Round 1 ===
Home	Score	Away	Match Information
Home	Score	Away	Date and Time	Venue	Referee
St Helens	40–0 (Note: Match abandoned after 62 minutes due to injury to York's Chloe James. There had already been a 50 minute delay due to injury to St Helens' Pippa Birchill. As over 60 minutes has been played the result stands.)	York City Knights	15 April 2018, 2:00pm	Ruskin Drive Sports Ground
Bradford Bulls	16–32	Leeds Rhinos	15 April 2018, 2:00pm	Odsal Stadium	S. Ellis
Wigan Warriors	54–0	Featherstone Rovers	15 April 2018, 2:00pm	Robin Park Arena

Bye: Castleford Tigers

=== Round 2 ===
Home	Score	Away	Match Information
Home	Score	Away	Date and Time	Venue	Referee
Featherstone Rovers	6–36	Leeds Rhinos	9 May 2018, 7:30pm (Note: 5 April, match postponed - waterlogged pitch)	L.D. Nutrition Stadium
Bradford Bulls	4–42	St Helens	22 April 2018, 2:00pm	Provident Stadium
York City Knights	0–62	Castleford Tigers	22 April 2018, 12:00	Nestle Rowntree Sports Park

Bye: Wigan Warriors

=== Round 3 ===
Home	Score	Away	Match Information
Home	Score	Away	Date and Time	Venue	Referee
Castleford Tigers	40–16	Bradford Bulls	29 April 2018, 2:00pm	Willowbridge Lane
St Helens	40–14	Featherstone Rovers	29 April 2018, 2:00pm	Hattons Solicitors Crusaders Park	A Billington
Wigan Warriors	14–20	Leeds Rhinos	29 April 2018, 2:00pm	Robin Park Arena

Bye: York City Knights

=== Round 4 ===
Home	Score	Away	Match Information
Home	Score	Away	Date and Time	Venue	Referee
Featherstone Rovers	32–38	Castleford Tigers	13 May 2018, 2:00pm	L.D. Nutrition Stadium
Bradford Bulls	72–10	York City Knights	13 May 2018, 2:00pm	Odsal Stadium
Wigan Warriors	16–6	St Helens	13 May 2018, 2:00pm	Robin Park Arena	R Stansfield

Bye: Leeds Rhinos

=== Round 5 ===
Home	Score	Away	Match Information
Home	Score	Away	Date and Time	Venue	Referee
Castleford Tigers	14–14	Wigan Warriors	6 May 2018, 2:00pm	Willowbridge Lane	N Pascall
St Helens	20–14	Leeds Rhinos	20 May 2018, 2:00pm	Ruskin Drive Sports Ground
York City Knights	12–40	Featherstone Rovers	20 May 2018, 2:00pm	Bootham Crescent

Bye: Bradford Bulls

=== Round 6 ===
Home	Score	Away	Match Information
Home	Score	Away	Date and Time	Venue	Referee
Leeds Rhinos	40–12	Castleford Tigers	27 May 2018, 2:00pm	Headingley	Scott Fernandez
Featherstone Rovers	22–46	Bradford Bulls	26 May 2018, 12:30pm	Bloomfield Road	Nick Pascall
Wigan Warriors	50–0	York City Knights	10 June 2018, 2:00pm	Robin Park Arena	Aaron Moore

Bye: St Helens

=== Round 7 ===
Home	Score	Away	Match Information
Home	Score	Away	Date and Time	Venue	Referee
Castleford Tigers	14–14	St Helens	17 June 2018, 2:00pm	Mend-A-Hose Jungle
Bradford Bulls	10–34	Wigan Warriors	17 June 2018, 2:00pm	Odsal Stadium
Leeds Rhinos	80–0	York City Knights	17 June 2018, 2:00pm	Weetwood Sports Park

Bye: Featherstone Rovers

=== Round 8 ===
Home	Score	Away	Match Information
Home	Score	Away	Date and Time	Venue	Referee
York City Knights	6–26	St Helens	24 June 2018, 2:00pm
Leeds Rhinos	30–10	Bradford Bulls	24 June 2018, 2:00pm	Weetwood Sports Park	Scott Fernandez
Featherstone Rovers	20–31	Wigan Warriors	24 June 2018, 2:00pm	L.D. Nutrition Stadium

Bye: Castleford Tigers

=== Round 9 ===
Home	Score	Away	Match Information
Home	Score	Away	Date and Time	Venue	Referee
Leeds Rhinos	70–6	Featherstone Rovers	8 July 2018, 2:00pm
St Helens	42–12	Bradford Bulls	8 July 2018, 2:00pm	Ruskin Drive
Castleford Tigers	40–10	York City Knights	8 July 2018, 2:00pm

Bye: Wigan Warriors

=== Round 10 ===
Home	Score	Away	Match Information
Home	Score	Away	Date and Time	Venue	Referee
Bradford Bulls	28–16	Castleford Tigers	12 August 2018, 2:00pm	Odsal Stadium	J. Powell
Featherstone Rovers	10–42	St Helens	12 August 2018, 2:00pm
Leeds Rhinos	22–23	Wigan Warriors	12 August 2018, 2:00pm

Bye: York City Knights

=== Round 11 ===
Home	Score	Away	Match Information
Home	Score	Away	Date and Time	Venue	Referee
St Helens	10–14	Wigan Warriors	19 August 2018, 2:00pm
York City Knights	8–38	Bradford Bulls	19 August 2018, 2:00pm
Castleford Tigers	34–8	Featherstone Rovers	23 September 2018, 2:00pm	Castleford RUFC

Bye: Leeds Rhinos

=== Round 12 ===
Home	Score	Away	Match Information
Home	Score	Away	Date and Time	Venue	Referee
Wigan Warriors	10–12	Castleford Tigers	9 September 2018, 2:00pm
Leeds Rhinos	12–6	St Helens	9 September 2018, 2:00pm
Featherstone Rovers	12–20	York City Knights	9 September 2018, 2:00pm

Bye: Bradford Bulls

=== Round 13 ===
Home	Score	Away	Match Information
Home	Score	Away	Date and Time	Venue	Referee
Bradford Bulls	32–10	Featherstone Rovers	16 September 2018, 2:00pm	Odsal Stadium
Castleford Tigers	20–32	Leeds Rhinos	16 September 2018, 2:00pm	Castleford RUFC	S. Fernandez
York City Knights	6–38	Wigan Warriors	16 September 2018, 2:00pm

Bye: St Helens

=== Round 14 ===
Home	Score	Away	Match Information
Home	Score	Away	Date and Time	Venue	Referee
St Helens	24–14	Castleford Tigers	28 September 2018, 2:00pm	Totally Wicked Stadium	S. Houghton
Wigan Warriors	26–8	Bradford Bulls	30 September 2018, 2:00pm	Robin Park Arena
York City Knights	8–50	Leeds Rhinos	30 September 2018, 2:00pm

Bye: Featherstone Rovers

== Regular season standings ==
Pos	Team	Pld	W	D	L	PF	PA	PD	Pts	Qualification
1	Leeds Rhinos	12	10	0	2	438	139	+299	20	League Leaders Shield/Play off semi-finals
2	Wigan Warriors	12	9	1	2	324	128	+196	19	Play-off semi-finals
3	St Helens	12	8	1	3	316	130	+186	17	Play-off semi-finals
4	Castleford Tigers	12	6	2	4	318	228	+90	14	Play-off semi-finals
5	Bradford Bulls	12	5	0	7	292	312	−20	10	
6	Featherstone Rovers	12	1	0	11	180	461	−281	2	
7	York City Knights	12	1	0	11	78	548	−470	2	

== Play-offs ==
=== Semi-finals ===
Home	Score	Away	Match Information
Home	Score	Away	Date and Time	Venue	Referee
Leeds Rhinos	24–10	Castleford Tigers	7 October 2018, 1:00pm	Weetwood Sports Village	R. Stansfield
Wigan Warriors	10–6	St Helens	7 October 2018, 2:00pm	Robin Park Arena

=== Grand final ===
13 October 2018
1:00pm BST

Leeds Rhinos	16 – 18	Wigan Warriors
Tries: Marshall, Beevers, S. Hill; Goals: C. Hill (2)	report	Tries: Thompson (3), Wilson; Goals: Foley

Manchester Regional Arena
Attendance: 1,189
Referee: A. Billington

Leeds Rhinos	Position	Wigan Warriors
Caitlin Beevers	FB	Rebecca Greenfield
Suze Hill	WG	Alison Burrows
Charlotte Booth	CE	Rachel Thompson
Sophie Robinson	CE	Georgia Wilson
Madison Laverick	WG	Michelle Davis
Hanna Butcher	SO	Gemma Walsh
Courtney Hill	SH	Sarah Harrison
Amy Johnson	PR	Hannah Goodburn
Rhiannion Marshall	HK	Claire Hall
Dannielle Anderson	PR	Chloe Hammond
Aimee Staveley	SR	Amanda Sibbald
Manina Spurr	SR	Vanessa Temple
Shannon Lacey	LF	Joanie Alpin
Frankie Townend	IN	Holly Speakman
Sophie Nuttall	IN	Charlotte Foley
Chloe Kerrigan	IN	Lucy Baggaley
Ellie Oldroyd	IN	Gemma Hennessey

The Grand Final was played at the Manchester Regional Arena on 13 October 2018. Neither team existed when the inaugural Grand Final was played in 2017. Leeds were seeking to complete the treble (League Leaders Shield, Challenge Cup and Grand Final winners) in their first season while Wigan were seeking their first ever trophy.

Leeds scored first, when Rhiannion Marshall scored a try from close range, Courtney Hill added the conversion. Wigan hit back a few minutes later when (Rachel Thompson scored their first try. The first half remained 6–4 to Leeds until shortly before half-time, when Thompson scored her, and Wigan's second try to make the half-time score 8–6 to Wigan.

In the second half Georgia Wilson extended Wigan's lead to 12–6 and Thompson completed her hat trick to put Wigan further ahead 16–6. Leeds struck back with a Caitlin Beevers solo effort, covering 80 metres from a 20-metre restart, Courtney Hill added the extra two points. With the score at 12–16, Leeds equalised as Suze Hill scored with only three minutes left to play. The conversion attempt was missed, and in stoppage time, Wigan were awarded a penalty which Charlotte Foley kicked to give Wigan victory by 18 points to 16.

== End of season awards ==
Georgia Roche (Castleford Tigers) was named as the inaugural Woman of Steel at the end of season awards.
