= Leigh Leopards Women =

English women's rugby league football club

Leigh Leopards
Club information
- Full name: Leigh Leopards Rugby League Football Club
- Website: leighleopards.co.uk/womens-team

Current details
- Grounds: Twist Lane; Leigh Sports Village
- Competition: RFL Women's Super League
- 2026: 4th in Shield (8th overall)
- Current season

Leigh Leopards Women are a women's rugby league team based in Leigh, Greater Manchester, England. The team originally competed as the ladies' team of Leigh Miners Rangers before an agreement between the club and Leigh Leopards led to the rebranding of the team in late 2022. In 2022 and 2023 the team took part in the Women's Super League before the restructuring of the league which saw them compete in the 2024 Northern Championship. In 2024, they won the National Championship Final and subsequent play-off to earn promotion back to the Super League in the 2025 season.

== History ==
=== Leigh Miners Rangers ===
In the early 2010s Leigh took part in the Women's Rugby League Conference where in 2012 they defeated Brighouse 12–10 to win the Plate competition. Leigh made their Challenge Cup debut in the inaugural 2012 competition, losing to Chorley Panthers in the first round. The following season they defeated Chorley in round one for their first win in the Challenge Cup. In the RFL Women's Rugby League Leigh won the Plate Final in 2015 and in the restructured league in 2016 they defeated the Oulton Raidettes 20–12 to become League 1 Champions. In the 2016 Challenge Cup, Leigh reached the final, but lost 62–6 to Thatto Heath Crusaders. In 2021, Leigh topped the Championship and then defeated Barrow Raiders 10–6 in the Grand Final. Both teams were admitted to Group 2 of the Super League for the 2022 season. On 15 May, Leigh made their Super League debut with a 28–14 home win over Wakefield Trinity. They won four of their matches to finish fifth in the table.

=== Leigh Leopards ===
In October 2022, it was announced that in a partnership agreement between the community and professional clubs in Leigh, the women's team of Leigh Miners Rangers were to merge with Leigh Leopards. Offers were made for the players and members of staff to retain their previous roles and the team would compete in the Super League under the new name. In the 2023 season, wins over Barrow and Hull KR in the Challenge Cup saw Leigh progress to the quarter-finals of the competition. The team continued to use Twist Lane as its home, but played their first match at Leigh Sports Village on 11 June against Featherstone Rovers. In the Super League, Leigh were top of Group 2 going into the final day of the regular season ahead of both Barrow and Featherstone Rovers by one point, but 14–12 a loss to Barrow saw them finish in third place. They faced Barrow again in the final of the play-offs where a 14–8 loss denied them a place in the restructured Super League in 2024. In January 2024, it was announced that they would be in the Northern Women's Championship. Leigh went unbeaten throughout the regular season and defeated Sheffield Eagles 46–6 in the Grand final to qualify for the National Championship Final against London Broncos, the winners of the Southern Championship. Leigh won 22–18 to lift the trophy. This saw them advance to a play-off match on 6 October against Featherstone Rovers which they won to earn promotion to the Super League for the 2025 season. Leigh reached the quarter-finals of the 2025 Challenge Cup and in July they won the Cup competition at the RFL Women's Nines.

In the 2026 Challenge Cup, Leigh exited the competition at the group stage with losses to Leeds Rhinos and London Broncos. In the Super League, Leigh were in sixth place at the mid-season split, but finished bottom in the Shield Competition on points difference following a 24–20 loss to Barrow in the final round. They then lost 36–6 against London Broncos in the promotion/relegation play-off and were demoted to the Championship for 2027.

== Seasons ==
Season	League									Play-offs	Challenge Cup	Ref.
Season	Division	P	W	D	L	F	A	Pts	Pos	Play-offs	Challenge Cup	Ref.
2021 (Note: As Leigh Miners Rangers)	Championship	12	8	2	2	246	104	18	1st	Won in Final	Did not participate	
2022	Super League Group 2	12	4	0	8	174	298	8	5th	Did not qualify	GS	
2023	Super League Group 2	10	7	1	2	271	108	15	3rd	Lost in Final	QF	
2024	Northern Championship	16	16	0	0	808	64	32	1st	Won in Grand Final (Note: Won in Grand Final, National Championship Final and promotion play-off)	GS	
2025	Super League	14	3	1	10	200	482	7	6th	Did not qualify	QF	
2026	Super League	7	2	0	5	64	292	4	6th	—N/a	GS	
2026	Shield (Note: standings carried over from regular season)	13	2	0	11	96	480	4	4th	Lost in play-off	GS	
