= 2025 RFL Women's Super League =

Women's rugby league competition in Great Britain

- Duration: 14 rounds + playoffs
- Teams: 8
- Matches played: 59
- Points scored: 3,142
- Highest attendance: 5,018; Wigan Warriors v St Helens (5 October 2025)
- Lowest attendance: 245; Barrow v Warrington (13 July 2025)
- Champions: Wigan Warriors
- League Leaders Shield Winners: Wigan Warriors
- Runners-up: St Helens
- Biggest home win: Leeds Rhinos 110–0 Warrington Wolves (15 June)
- Biggest away win: Barrow Raiders 0–92 Wigan Warriors (30 August)
- Woman of Steel: Eva Hunter (Wigan Warriors)
- Top point-scorer: Isabel Rowe (210)
- Top try-scorers: Eva Hunter; Dani McGifford; (20 tries each)

Promotion and relegation
- Promoted from Championship: Featherstone Rovers
- Relegated to Championship: Warrington Wolves

The 2025 RFL Women's Super League (also known as the Betfred Women's Super League for sponsorship reasons) was the ninth season of the Women's Super League, for female players in clubs affiliated to the Rugby Football League (RFL).

The regular season featured 14 rounds commencing on 16 May with the opening fixture between the 2024 champions, York Valkyrie, and Wigan Warriors, and concluded on 14 September.

The club finishing bottom was expected to play-off against the winners of the 2025 RFL Women's Championship, for a place in the 2026 RFL Women's Super League. Due to Warrington's withdrawal from the league on 5 September, this game was cancelled and Championship winners were promoted automatically. Warrington were later docked 9 points for failing to fulfil four of their fixtures.

Wigan Warriors defeated St Helens 16–12 in the Grand Final which saw a new record attendance of 5,018 for a women's grand final, to complete the treble, and their first grand final win since 2018.

== Teams ==
Locations of 2025 Super League teams

The eight clubs in the 2025 Super League were all from Northern England. Seven teams from the 2024 Super League were joined by Leigh Leopards who, after winning the 2024 Championship, replaced Featherstone Rovers by winning promotion via a play-off.

- Barrow Raiders
- Huddersfield Giants
- Leeds Rhinos
- Leigh Leopards
- St Helens
- Warrington Wolves
- Wigan Warriors
- York Valkyrie

== Table ==
Pos	Team	Pld	W	D	L	PF	PA	PD	Pts	Qualification or relegation
1	Wigan Warriors (Note: On 5 September, Warrington announced, that they had taken the decision to withdraw from the remainder of the season due to player injuries and availability. The remaining two fixtures against Leigh, and Wigan are awarded as 48–0 wins respectively, and therefore confirms Warrington are officially relegated.) (L, C)	14	12	1	1	752	120	+632	25	Advance to semi-finals
2	St Helens	14	11	2	1	590	112	+478	24	Advance to semi-finals
3	York Valkyrie	14	10	0	4	462	166	+296	20	Advance to semi-finals
4	Leeds Rhinos	14	9	1	4	586	186	+400	19	Advance to semi-finals
5	Huddersfield Giants	14	5	1	8	268	428	−160	11	
6	Leigh Leopards	14	3	1	10	200	482	−282	7	
7	Barrow Raiders	14	3	0	11	132	726	−594	6	
8	Warrington Wolves (R)	14	0	0	14	56	826	−770	−9 (Note: On 29 September 2025, Warrington Wolves were deducted nine points for failing to fulfill four of their games during the 2025 Season.)	Relegation to Championship

Rules for classification: 1) competition points 2) points difference (points scored minus points conceded) 3) points scored percentage (points scored divided by points conceded, multiplied by 100).
(C) Champions; (L) League Leaders' Shield Winners; (R) Relegated

== Play-offs ==
The play-off semi-finals were played on 21 September. The Grand Final was played on 5 October.

=== Team bracket ===
Semi-finals
1	Wigan Warriors	38
4	Leeds Rhinos	0
2	St Helens	12
3	York Valkyrie	8

Grand Final
1	Wigan Warriors	16
2	St Helens	12

=== Semi-finals ===
21 September 2025
17:00 BST (UTC+01:00)

St Helens	12–8	York Valkyrie
Tries: Mottershead, Casey; Goals: Gaskin (2)		Tries: Renouf, Dagger

Totally Wicked Stadium, St Helens, Merseyside
Referee: Oliver Salmon

21 September 2025
19:30 BST (UTC+01:00)

Wigan Warriors	38–0	Leeds Rhinos
Tries: Coleman (2), R. Hunter, E. Hunter (2), Atherton, Power; Goals: Rowe (5)

Brick Community Stadium, Wigan
Attendance: 2,108
Referee: Tara Jones

=== Grand Final ===
5 October 2025
17:30 BST (UTC+01:00)

Wigan Warriors	16–12	St Helens
Tries: Davies (2), Jones (2); Goals: Rowe (0/4)		Tries: McGifford, Hook (2); Goals: Gaskin (0/3)

Brick Community Stadium, Wigan
Attendance: 5,018
Referee: Tara Jones
Player of the Match: Anna Davies (Wigan)

Team details
Wigan Warriors		Position	St Helens
Name	Number	Position	Number	Name
Grace Banks	1	FB	1	Rebecca Rotheram
Anna Davies	2	WG	2	Phoebe Hook
Georgia Wilson	3	CE	3	Beri Salihi
Molly Jones	4	CE	4	Rachael Woosey
Ruby Hunter	5	WG	5	Dani McGifford
Jenna Foubister	6	SO	6	Jodie Cunningham
Isabel Rowe	7	SH	7	Faye Gaskin
Mary Coleman	8	PR	8	Chantelle Crowl
Remi Wilton	9	HK	9	Katie Mottershead
Victoria Molyneux	10	PF	10	Shona Hoyle
Eva Hunter	11	SR	11	Luci McColm
Cerys Jones	12	SR	12	Emily Rudge
Megan Williams	13	LF	13	Caitlin Casey
Carys Marsh	14	IN	14	Zoe Harris
Shaniah Power	15	IN	15	Vicky Whitfield
Emily Veivers	16	IN	16	Naomi Williams
Mia-Jayne Atherton	17	IN	17	Erin McDonald
Jade Gregory-Haselden	18	CS	18	Darcy Stott
Denis Betts		Coach		Derek Hardman and Craig Richards

The 2025 Women's Super League Grand Final saw Wigan Warriors complete the treble, the first of the club's history. It also saw a record attendance of 5,018.

== Player statistics ==
=== Top 5 try scorers ===
Rank	Player (s)	Club	Tries
1	(England) Danielle McGifford	St Helens	20
1	(England) Eva Hunter	Wigan Warriors	20
3	(England) Amelia Brown	Huddersfield Giants	18
4	(England) Grace Banks	Wigan Warriors	17
5	(England) Ebony Stead	Leeds Rhinos	16

=== Top 5 goal scorers ===
Rank	Player (s)	Club	Goals
1	(England) Isabel Rowe	Wigan Warriors	95
2	(Australia) Melanie Howard	Leeds Rhinos	54
3	(England) Faye Gaskin	St Helens	42
4	(Australia) Ellie Williamson	York Valkyrie	31
5	(England) Sam Hulme	Huddersfield Giants	24

=== Top 5 points scorers ===
Rank	Player (s)	Club	Points
1	(England) Isabel Rowe	Wigan Warriors	210
2	(Australia) Melanie Howard	Leeds Rhinos	136
3	(England) Faye Gaskin	St Helens	104
4	(England) Eva Hunter	Wigan Warriors	80
5	(England) Danielle McGifford	St Helens	76

As of 6 October 2025 (Regular season and play-offs)

== Broadcasting ==
On 5 December 2024, Sky Sports announced that, as with the 2024 season, it would broadcast three regular season games, the play-offs and Grand Final.

Round	Match	Date
1	Wigan Warriors v York Valkyrie	16 May 2025
7	Leeds Rhinos v St Helens	11 July 2025
13	St Helens v Wigan Warriors	5 September 2025
Semi-finals	St Helens v York Valkyrie	21 September
Semi-finals	Wigan Warriors v Leeds Rhinos	21 September
Grand Final	Wigan Warriors v St Helens	5 October

== End of season awards ==
The End of season awards took place on 7 October 2025, alongside the men's Super League, Championship, and League 1 and Wheelchair Super League awards.

The winners were:

Woman of Steel: Eva Hunter (Wigan Warriors)
Young player of the year: Isabel Rowe (Wigan Warriors)
Coach of the year: Denis Betts (Wigan Warriors)
