= Wigan Warriors Women =

Women's Rugby League team

Club information
- Full name: Wigan Warriors Rugby League Football Club
- Founded: Thursday 21st November 1872, (Women’s team created in 2017)

Current details
- Ground: Edge Hall Road (3,000)
- Coach: Denis Betts
- Captain: Georgia Wilson
- Competition: Women's Super League
- 2026 Season: 1st (Runners up)
- Current season

Uniforms
Home colours	Away colours

Records
- Women's Super League: 2 (2018, 2025)
- RFL Women's Nines: 2 (2024, 2025)
- Challenge Cup: 2 (2025, 2026)
- League Leaders Shield: 2 (2025, 2026)

Wigan Warriors Women are the official women's team of the Wigan Warriors club. The team is one of eleven teams the club currently boasts. The team was created in 2017 and had its first season in 2018. The club competes in the RFL Women's Super League which the team won during its first season.

The team plays its home games at Robin Park Arena, Wigan which doubles as the elite performance facility for many of the Wigan club's teams.

The team are the current holders of the Women's Challenge Cup, the RFL Women's Nines, (winning the tournament on 28 July 2024 at Craven Park, Hull, and again in 2025), the League Leaders Shield, and the Women's Super League

In 2023, England international Vicky Molyneux became the first female inductee into the club's Hall of Fame.

== History ==
Wigan Warriors women's team was established in October 2017 ahead of the 2018 RFL Women's Super League. The team won the league championship in their inaugural season beating Leeds Rhinos 18–16 in the Grand Final at the Manchester Regional Arena. At the end of the 2023 season, vice-captain Vicky Molyneux became the first female player to enter the Wigan Warriors Hall of Fame. The team played their first match at the DW Stadium during the opening game of the 2024 Super League in a 18–4 victory over Barrow Raiders. Midway through the 2024 season, the club moved their training base to Edge Hall Road which had been redeveloped into an elite women's training facility by Wigan Warriors and Wigan Athletic. In May 2025, The Guardian praised the club for establishing itself as regular challenges amongst the traditional top three of St Helens, Leeds, and York, described it as a "watershed moment" for the women's game. The club finished the 2025 season as treble winners following a 2025 Super League Grand Final victory over St Helens, after beating them in the Challenge Cup final earlier in the year, and lifting the League Leaders' Shield. They did so as an amateur side, with the aforementioned "traditional top three" having become semi-professional in the last few years.

== Teams ==
Wigan Warriors Women are one of 11 teams operated by Wigan Warriors, the others are:

- Women's academy (under 19s)
- Men's first team
- Men's Reserves
- Men's Academy (under 18s)
- Men's Scholarship (under 16s)
- College development squad (men and women aged 16–18)
- Physical disability
- Learning disability
- Wheelchair (mixed)
- Wheelchair A (wheelchair reserve team)
- Touch Rugby

== 2026 squad ==
2026 Wigan Warriors Women Squad
First team squad		Coaching staff
(England) 1 Grace Banks – FB; (England) 2 Anna Davies – WG; (England) 3 Georgia Wilson (c) – CE, FB, WG; (England) 4 Molly Jones – CE; (England) 5 Ellise Derbyshire – WG; (England) 6 Jenna Foubister – SO; (England) 7 Isabel Rowe (gk) – SH, SO; (England) 8 Mary Coleman – PR; (Wales) 9 Carys Marsh – HK; (England) 10 Mia-Jayne Atherton – PR; (England) 11 Eva Hunter – SR	(England) 12 Cerys Jones – SR; (England) 13 Megan Williams – LF; (England) 14 Rachel Thompson – LF, CE; (Wales) 15 Bethan Dainton – LF; (England) 16 Beri Salihi – FB; (England) 17 Kelsey Gentles – WG; (Australia) 19 Remi Wilton – HK; (England) 20 Lucie Sams – LF; (England) 21 Jade Gregory-Haselden – PR; (England) 22 Ruby Hunter – WG; (England) 23 Charlotte Meredith – SH	Head coach: (England) Denis Betts; Legend: (c) Captain(s); (vc) Vice-captain(s); (gk) = Goal kicker; Updated: 1 April 2026; Source(s): 2026 Squad Numbers

== Seasons ==
Season	League									Play-offs	Challenge Cup	9s
Season	Division	P	W	D	L	F	A	Pts	Pos	Play-offs	Challenge Cup	9s
2018	Super League	12	9	1	2	324	128	19	2nd	Won in Grand Final	SF	—N/a
2019	Super League	14	6	1	7	328	224	13	4th	Lost in semi-final	QF	—N/a
2020	Super League	Cancelled due to the COVID-19 pandemic										—N/a
2021	Super League	11	5	0	6	254	186	10	5th	Did not qualify	QF	—N/a
2022	Super League	8	2	0	6	104	313	4	4th	Lost in semi-final	QF	QR
2023	Super League	10	3	1	6	116	250	7	4th	Lost in semi-final	SF	RU
2024	Super League	14	9	0	5	532	144	18	4th	Lost in semi-final	SF	W
2025	Super League	14	12	1	1	752	120	25	1st	Won in Grand Final	W	W
2026	Super League										W	Sh: W

== Honours ==
=== Leagues ===
- Women's Super League
  Grand Final
  Winners (2): 2018, 2025
  League Leader's Shield
  Winners (1): 2025
  Runners-up (1): 2018

=== Cups ===
- Women's Challenge Cup
  Winners (2): 2025, 2026
- RFL Women's Nines
  Winners (2): 2024, 2025
  Runners-up (1): 2023
