= Warrington Wolves Women =

Warrington Wolves
Club information
- Full name: Warrington Wolves Rugby League Football Club
- Colours: Yellow, Blue and White
- Founded: 2018; 8 years ago
- Website: Warrington Wolves

Current details
- Ground: Victoria Park, Warrington
- Competition: National Championship
- 2026: 4th

Records
- Championship: 1 (2019)
- Super League Shield: 1 (2022)

Warrington Wolves Women are the women's rugby league team of Warrington Wolves in Warrington, Cheshire, England. They compete in the RFL Women's Championship, playing their home games at Victoria Park and some games at the Halliwell Jones Stadium; the home of the men's team.

== History ==
In November 2018, it was announced that Warrington Wolves were to launch a women's team and that team trials had been organised to take place in December. There had previously been a Warrington Wolves women's team established in 2002 who also who used Victoria Park. In 2004, the team competed in the Women's League Division Three and won the Plate Final of the Women's Amateur Rugby League Association in 2007. In 2008, they joined the Women's Rugby League Conference, winning the Championship Final in 2011, and then also competing in the 2012 Women's Challenge Cup. Warrington also had girls' teams for several age groups; Emily Rudge had been with the U16s when selected for the England squad for the 2008 World Cup. In July 2009, five Warrington players, including Rudge and Jodie Cunningham, were named in the England squad for the two-test series against France.

The community coach at Warrington, Lee Westwood, said in 2018 that the women's team would "provide a pathway for all girls from 11 years old to open age". For their first season the team entered the Championship with the aim of joining the Super League in 2020. Despite losing their first match of the season 28–20 at Barrow, Warrington defeated Widnes 40–10 the following week and went on to finish top of the Championship. A 36–4 victory over Huddersfield Giants in the play-off semi-final saw Warrington progress to the final on 12 October in which they defeated Barrow 40–4 to take the Championship title. Their top four finish in the league meant that they, along with Huddersfield, were accepted into the Super League for the following season. In the Challenge Cup Warrington reached the quarter-finals before being knocked out by eventual winners Leeds Rhinos.

In 2020, Warrington were to face Barrow again, this time in the second round of the Challenge Cup. However, a week before the match the RFL suspended all competitions. The cancellation of the women's 2020 season was announced in August. This included the Super League in which Warrington had been due to make their debut on 29 March against Wigan Warriors. The following season, on 18 April 2021, Warrington played their first Super League game and lost 52–8 to Wigan. Their first win, 44–8 over Huddersfield, came in Round 5 of the season. After finishing the regular season in 8th place, Warrington took part in the Shield competition, but lost 30–26 to Huddersfield after golden point extra time in the semi-final Warrington reached the quarter-finals of the Challenge Cup but lost 6–26 to Castleford Tigers.

In 2022, there was a new format for the Challenge Cup that introduced a group stage from which Warrington advanced to the quarter-finals where they were defeated by Leeds. The structure of the Super League season also changed and Warrington were placed in Group 2 of the competition. Warrington finished the regular season top of their group by winning all 12 matches including a 102–0 victory over Wakefield Trinity. Warrington then claimed the Shield by winning 72–0 over Bradford Bulls in the semi-final and 34–6 over Featherstone Rovers in the final to earn promotion to Group 1 for the 2023 Super League season. In 2023, Warrington reached the quarter-finals of the Challenge Cup for a four successive campaign. Lee Westwood stepped down from his role as head coach at the end of the 2023 season and was succeeded by former player and team captain Armani Sharrock. Warrington continued their run of Challenge Cup quarter-final appearances in 2024 for a fifth successive tournament. In the Super League a loss to Huddersfield on the final day of the regular season saw Warrington finish the season in seventh place, but six points clear of potential relegation. At the end of the season, Sharrock stepped down as head coach and was succeeded in the role by Ged Ginty who was appointed on 4 December 2024. In April 2025, Warrington exited the Challenge Cup exit at the group stage after two losses which included a 102–0 defeat to St Helens. In June, Warrington suffered a record Super League defeat, losing 110–0 to Leeds Rhinos. At the end of July, by which time the team were still without a win, Ged Ginty was suspended by the RFL over comments made on social media. Injuries and player availability issues meant Warrington had difficulties in raising a team and on 5 September it was announced that they would forfeit their remaining fixtures for the season including the play-off against the winners of the 2025 Northern Championship and would therefore be relegated.

In July 2026, Warrington were runners-up in the Challenge Shield losing 18–10 to Manchester Swinton Lionesses in the final. In the 2026 National Championship, Warrington finished the season in fourth place before losing their play-off semi-final 38–14 against Manchester Swinton.

== Seasons ==
Season	League									Play-offs	Challenge Cup	Ref.
Season	Division	P	W	D	L	F	A	Pts	Pos	Play-offs	Challenge Cup	Ref.
2019	Championship	14	13	0	1	572	84	26	1st	Won in Final	QF	
2020	Super League	Cancelled due to the COVID-19 pandemic										
2021	Super League	8	2	0	6	150	334	4	8th	Did not qualify	QF	
2021	Super League Shield	4	2	0	2	148	68	4	3rd	Lost in semi-final	QF	
2022	Super League (G2)	12	12	0	0	744	36	24	1st	Won in Shield Final	QF	
2023	Super League	10	2	1	7	128	450	5	5th	Did not qualify	QF	
2024	Super League	14	3	0	11	96	671	6	7th	Did not qualify	QF	
2025	Super League	14	0	0	14	56	826	–9	8th	Did not qualify	GS	
2026	National Championship	12	9	0	3	516	148	18	4th	Lost in semi-final	—N/a	

== Honours ==
- Super League
  - Super League Shield: 2022
- Championship
  - League Leaders: 2019
  - Grand Final Winners: 2019
