= Barrow Raiders Ladies =

English women's rugby league football club

Barrow Raiders
Club information
- Full name: Barrow Rugby League Football Club Ltd
- Colours: Blue and White
- Founded: 2021; 5 years ago
- Website: barrowrlfc.com

Current details
- Ground: Craven Park
- Coach: Amanda Wilkinson
- Competition: RFL Women's Super League
- 2026: 3rd in Shield (7th overall)
- Current season

Barrow Raiders Ladies are the women's rugby league team of Barrow Raiders from Barrow-in-Furness, Cumbria, England. They compete in the Women's Super League, and play their home games at Craven Park. Before taking the Barrow Raiders name the team were called Barrow Island Ladies.

== History ==
In 2016, Barrow Ladies played in the Merit League and were based at Barrow Island ARLFC. They initially had difficulty in finding opponents as many of their games were cancelled. Barrow had previously had a women's team that had included Great Britain internationals such as Lindsay Anfield, Sally Milburn and Allie and Liz Kitchin, but by 2016 it had been more than ten years since Barrow had last played a competitive home fixture. Barrow entered in the 2016/17 WRLA Winter League, but by the end of January they had withdrawn from the competition and in March 2017 they joined the Women's Premier Division. At the end of April they made their Challenge Cup debut in a 58–13 loss to the Oulton Raidettes. In 2018, Barrow recorded their first win in the Challenge Cup defeating Brighouse Rangers 62–10 to reach the second round (quarter-finals). In 2019, Barrow finished second in the Championship. On 15 September, for their final home game of the regular season, Barrow faced Oulton in the first women's game to be played at Craven Park. Barrow reached the Championship Grand Final with a 14–12 semi-final victory over Stanningley, but lost 40–4 to Warrington Wolves who had also knocked Barrow out of the Challenge Cup earlier in the season. In 2020, Barrow were to face Warrington in the second round of the Challenge Cup again. However, a week before the match the RFL suspended all competitions.

On 14 March 2021, it was announced that Barrow Island Ladies had been adopted by Barrow Raiders to form Barrow Raiders Ladies. In the 2021 season, Barrow reached the Grand Final of the Championship by defeating Widnes Vikings 16–6 in the play-offs. They lost the final 10–6 to the league leaders, Leigh Miners Rangers, but a top two finish in the league meant promotion along with Leigh to Group 2 of the Super League. In November 2021, Amanda Wilkinson was appointed as Head Coach. The 2022 season began for Barrow with the Challenge Cup. After defeats to St Helens and Warrington, a 36–0 win over the Army was not enough for Barrow to progress from the group stage. Barrow made their Super League debut on 15 May with a 32–6 loss at home to Warrington. Barrow finished second in Group 2 before losing 12–10 to Featherstone Rovers in the play-off semi-final. As with the 2022 season, Barrow began 2023 with two defeats in the Challenge Cup before ending their campaign with a win; 20–11 over Hull Kingston Rovers. A closely fought Super League competition saw the top three teams in Group 2 (Leigh Leopards, Barrow and Featherstone) separated by only one point going into the final day of the regular season. In the last round of matches Barrow defeated Leigh but missed out on automatic promotion as they finished behind the league leaders, Featherstone, on points difference. However, a 14–8 victory over Leigh in the Group 2 Final secured their place in the restructured Super League in 2024.

In the 2024 season, Barrow exited the Challenge Cup at the group stage, but their performance in the Super League saw them finish in fifth place and earned Amanda Wilkinson a nomination for the coach of the year award. An injury-hit squad in the 2025 caused Barrow to change their starting thirteen for each match throughout the season. Following a group stage exit in the Challenge Cup they won only three league matches to finish the Super League in seventh-place. In 2026, the withdrawal of Salford from the Challenge Cup meant that Barrow and York Valkyrie both progressed from Group D. Barrow then lost to St Helens in the quarter-finals. In the Super League, Barrow lost all seven of their regular season games and were in last place at the mid-season split. Their first win came in the third round of the Shield competition when the defeated Leigh 16–8 and a second win against the same opponents, 24–20, in their final match of the season saw Barrow move off the bottom of the table to secure their Super League place for 2027.

== Seasons ==
Season	League									Play-offs	Challenge Cup	Ref.
Season	Division	P	W	D	L	F	A	Pts	Pos	Play-offs	Challenge Cup	Ref.
2021	Championship	12	8	1	3	288	144	17	2nd	Lost in Final	Did not participate	
2022	Super League Group 2	12	9	0	3	386	168	18	2nd	Lost in Semi-Final	GS	
2023	Super League Group 2	10	8	0	2	336	88	16	2nd	Won in Final	GS	
2024	Super League	14	5	0	9	172	432	10	5th	Did not qualify	GS	
2025	Super League	14	3	0	11	132	726	6	7th	Did not qualify	GS	
2026	Super League	7	0	0	7	82	272	0	8th	—N/a	QF	
2026	Shield (Note: standings carried over from regular season)	13	2	0	11	162	434	4	3rd	Did not qualify	QF	
