= 2022 RFL Women's Super League results =

The fixture list for the 2022 Women's Super League were announced on 18 January 2022.

The regular season started in May 2022, and ended with the Grand Final on 18 September. Dates and arrangements for the subsequent play-offs and the grand final were announced during the season.

All times are UK local time (UTC+01:00)

== Regular season ==
=== Round 1 ===
Betfred Women's Super League: round one
Group	Home	Score	Away	Match Information
Group	Home	Score	Away	Date and Time	Venue	Referee	Attendance
Group 1	St Helens	44–0	Wigan Warriors	15 May 2022, 14:00	Totally Wicked Stadium
Group 1	Huddersfield Giants	6–50	York City Knights	15 May 2022, 14:00	Huddersfield YMCA
Group 2	Barrow Raiders	6–32	Warrington Wolves	15 May 2022, 14:00	Craven Park
Group 2	Bradford Bulls	0–30	Featherstone Rovers	15 May 2022, 14:00	Odsal Sedbergh
Group 2	Leigh Miners Rangers	28–16	Wakefield Trinity	15 May 2022, 14:00	Twist Lane

=== Round 2 ===
Betfred Women's Super League: round two
Group	Home	Score	Away	Match Information
Group	Home	Score	Away	Date and Time	Venue	Referee	Attendance
Group 1	Leeds Rhinos	60–4	Huddersfield Giants	20 May 2022, 17:45	Headingley Stadium
Group 1	York City Knights	13–6	St Helens	22 May 2022, 17:15	York Community Stadium
Group 2	Bradford Bulls	12–8	Leigh Miners Rangers	22 May 2022, 14:00	Odsal Sedbergh
Group 2	Featherstone Rovers	56–6	Castleford Tigers	22 May 2022, 14:00	Post Office Road
Group 2	Warrington Wolves	86–0	Wakefield Trinity	22 May 2022, 14:00	Halliwell Jones Stadium

=== Round 3 ===
Betfred Women's Super League: round three
Group	Home	Score	Away	Match Information
Group	Home	Score	Away	Date and Time	Venue	Referee	Attendance
Group 1	York City Knights	24–10	Leeds Rhinos	5 June 2022, 12:00	York Community Stadium
Group 1	Huddersfield Giants	18–30	Wigan Warriors	5 June 2022, 14:00	Huddersfield YMCA
Group 2	Wakefield Trinity	10–28	Bradford Bulls	4 June 2022, 12:00	Belle Vue
Group 2	Barrow Raiders	40–6	Leigh Miners Rangers	5 June 2022, 12:00	Craven Park
Group 2	Featherstone Rovers	0–48	Warrington Wolves	5 June 2022, 14:00	Post Office Road

=== Round 4 ===
Betfred Women's Super League: round four
Group	Home	Score	Away	Match Information
Group	Home	Score	Away	Date and Time	Venue	Referee	Attendance
Group 1	St Helens	18–20	Leeds Rhinos	23 June 2022, 17:30	Totally Wicked Stadium
Group 1	Wigan Warriors	0–46	York City Knights	26 June 2022, 14:00	Robin Park Arena
Group 2	Featherstone Rovers	34–4	Leigh Miners Rangers	26 June 2022, 12:00	Post Office Road
Group 2	Barrow Raiders	46–10	Castleford Tigers	26 June 2022, 14:00	Craven Park
Group 2	Bradford Bulls	0–54	Warrington Wolves	26 June 2022, 17:15	Odsal Stadium

=== Round 5 ===
Betfred Women's Super League: round five
Group	Home	Score	Away	Match Information
Group	Home	Score	Away	Date and Time	Venue	Referee	Attendance
Group 1	St Helens	62–0	Huddersfield Giants	3 July 2022, 14:00	Totally Wicked Stadium
Group 1	Wigan Warriors	12–48	Leeds Rhinos	3 July 2022, 14:00	Robin Park Arena
Group 2	Warrington Wolves	72–0	Leigh Miners Rangers	3 July 2022, 11:30	Halliwell Jones Stadium
Group 2	Wakefield Trinity	8–4	Castleford Tigers	3 July 2022, 12:00	The Be Well Support Stadium
Group 2	Bradford Bulls	14–18	Barrow Raiders	3 July 2022, 14:00	Odsal Stadium

=== Round 6 ===
Betfred Women's Super League: round six
Group	Home	Score	Away	Match Information
Group	Home	Score	Away	Date and Time	Venue	Referee	Attendance
Group 1	York City Knights	50–0	Huddersfield Giants	17 July 2022, 15:00	York Community Stadium
Group 1	Leeds Rhinos	64–6	Wigan Warriors	21 July 2022, 17:30	Headingley Stadium
Group 2	Castleford Tigers	16–48	Bradford Bulls	17 July 2022, 13:00	The Mend-A-Hose Jungle
Group 2	Leigh Miners Rangers	14–10	Featherstone Rovers	17 July 2022, 14:00	Twist Lane
Group 2	Wakefield Trinity	4–50	Barrow Raiders	17 July 2022, 14:00	Belle Vue
Group 2	Barrow Raiders	68–4	Wakefield Trinity	24 July 2022, 14:00	Craven Park
Group 2	Castleford Tigers	4–38	Featherstone Rovers	24 July 2022, 14:00	The Mend-A-Hose Jungle
Group 2	Warrington Wolves	60–0	Bradford Bulls	24 July 2022, 14:00	Victoria Park

=== Round 7 ===
Betfred Women's Super League: round seven
Group	Home	Score	Away	Match Information
Group	Home	Score	Away	Date and Time	Venue	Referee	Attendance
Group 1	Huddersfield Giants	0–82	Leeds Rhinos	31 July 2022, 14:00	Huddersfield YMCA
Group 1	St Helens	12–4	York City Knights	31 July 2022, 14:00	Totally Wicked Stadium
Group 2	Barrow Raiders	12–4	Featherstone Rovers	31 July 2022, 11:00	Headingley Stadium
Group 2	Leigh Miners Rangers	50–4	Castleford Tigers	31 July 2022, 14:00	Twist Lane
Group 2	Wakefield Trinity	0–102	Warrington Wolves	31 July 2022, 14:00	The Be Well Support Stadium

=== Round 8 ===
Betfred Women's Super League: round eight
Group	Home	Score	Away	Match Information
Group	Home	Score	Away	Date and Time	Venue	Referee	Attendance
Group 1	Leeds Rhinos	22–30	St Helens	7 August 2022, 12:00	Headingley Stadium
Group 1	Wigan Warriors	42–4	Huddersfield Giants	7 August 2022, 14:00	Robin Park Arena
Group 2	Castleford Tigers	0–78	Barrow Raiders	7 August 2022, 14:00	The Mend-A-Hose Jungle
Group 2	Warrington Wolves	44–6	Featherstone Rovers	7 August 2022, 15:00	Halliwell Jones Stadium
Group 2	Bradford Bulls	26–0	Wakefield Trinity	7 August 2022, 17:00	Odsal Stadium

=== Round 9 ===
Betfred Women's Super League: round nine
Group	Home	Score	Away	Match Information
Group	Home	Score	Away	Date and Time	Venue	Referee	Attendance
Group 1	York City Knights	33–10	Wigan Warriors	14 August 2022, 15:00	York Community Stadium
Group 1	Huddersfield Giants	0–86	St Helens	23 August 2022, 20:00 (Note: original match on 14 August postponed, due to extenuating circumstances at Huddersfield)	Siddal ARLFC
Group 2	Featherstone Rovers	50–0	Bradford Bulls	14 August 2022, 12:30	Millennium Stadium
Group 2	Castleford Tigers	14–8	Leigh Miners Rangers	14 August 2022, 14:00	Castleford Panthers Sports Club
Group 2	Warrington Wolves	72–6	Barrow Raiders	14 August 2022, 15:00	Halliwell Jones Stadium

=== Round 10 ===
Betfred Women's Super League: round ten
Group	Home	Score	Away	Match Information
Group	Home	Score	Away	Date and Time	Venue	Referee	Attendance
Group 1	Leeds Rhinos	14–22	York City Knights	28 August 2022, 13:00	Headingley Stadium
Group 1	Wigan Warriors	4–56	St Helens	28 August 2022, 14:00	Robin Park Arena
Group 2	Barrow Raiders	38–0	Bradford Bulls	21 August 2022, 12:00	Craven Park
Group 2	Wakefield Trinity	6–36	Leigh Miners Rangers	21 August 2022, 14:00	The Be Well Support Stadium
Group 2	Castleford Tigers	36–8	Wakefield Trinity	28 August 2022, 14:00	The Mend-A-Hose Jungle
Group 2	Featherstone Rovers	14–10	Barrow Raiders	28 August 2022, 14:00	The Millennium Stadium
Group 2	Leigh Miners Rangers	0–56	Warrington Wolves	28 August 2022, 14:00	Twist Lane
Group 2	Warrington Wolves	66–6	Castleford Tigers	30 August 2022, 19:30	Victoria Park
Group 2	Castleford Tigers	6–52	Warrington Wolves	4 September 2022, 14:00	The Mend-A-Hose Jungle
Group 2	Leigh Miners Rangers	12–24	Bradford Bulls	4 September 2022, 14:00	Twist Lane
Group 2	Wakefield Trinity	4–68	Featherstone Rovers	4 September 2022, 14:00	Weeland Road (Sharlston Rovers)

== Play-offs ==
=== Semi-finals ===
Group 1
Home	Score	Away	Match Information
Home	Score	Away	Date and Time	Venue	Referee	Attendance
York City Knights	12–4	Wigan Warriors	4 September 2022, 15:00	Headingley	Ryan Cox
St Helens	6–14	Leeds Rhinos	4 September 2022, 17:15	Headingley	James Jones

Group 2
Home	Score	Away	Match Information
Home	Score	Away	Date and Time	Venue	Referee	Attendance
Warrington Wolves	72–0	Bradford Bulls	11 September 2022, 15:00	Victoria Park, Warrington	Mark Clayton
Barrow Raiders	10–12	Featherstone Rovers	11 September 2022, 15:00	Craven Park, Barrow	Jordan Hughes

=== Grand final ===
18 September 2022
15:00

York City Knights	4–12	Leeds Rhinos
Tries: Peach	Report	Tries: Beevers (2); Goals: Winfield-Hill (2)

Totally Wicked Stadium
Attendance: 2,151
Referee: Mike Smaill
Player of the Match: Caitlin Beevers

York City Knights	Position	Leeds Rhinos
#1 Tara-Jane Stanley	Fullback	#4 Fran Goldthorp
#15 Georgia Taylor	Wing	#2 Tara Moxon
#3 Tamzin Renouf	Centre	#13 Hannah Butcher
#7 Katie Langan	Centre	#4 Caitlin Beevers
#5 Kelsey Gentles	Wing	#3 Sophie Robinson
#26 Olivia Gale	Stand-off	#18 Sam Hulme
#28 Lacey Owen	Scrum-half	#7 Courtney Winfield-Hill
#6 Georgie Hetherington	Prop	#10 Danielle Anderson
#4 Savannah Andrade	Hooker	#9 Keara Bennett
#11 Hollie Dodd	Prop	#20 Emma Lumley
#29 Elisa Apka	Second-row	#5 Sophie Nuttall
#9 Sinead Peach	Second-row	#23 Lucy Murray
#12 Olivia Wood	Loose forward	#15 Zoe Hornby
#17 Emma Kershaw	interchange	#19 Jasmine Earnshaw-Cudjoe
#32 Leila Bessahli	interchange	#14 Shannon Lacey
#13 Jasmine Bell	interchange	#25 Beth Lockwood
#23 Matilda Butler	interchange	#11 Chloe Kerrigan

=== Shield Final ===
18 September 2022
12:30

Warrington Wolves	34–6	Featherstone Rovers
Tries: Johnson, Bound (2), Baggaley, Roberts, Sutherland; Goals: Davis 5/6	Report	Tries: Dadds; Goals: Watts

Totally Wicked Stadium
Referee: Aaryn Belafonte

Warrington Wolves	Position	Featherstone Rovers
#1 Michelle Davis	Fullback	#33 Jessica Dadds
#21 Georgia Sutherland	Wing	#2 Ellie Lamb
#3 Emily Baggaley	Centre	#3 Chloe Billington
#30 Jessica Courtman	Centre	#1 Fran Copley
#5 Samantha Simpson	Wing	#22 Nat Carr
#6 Lucy Eastwood	Stand-off	#7 Danielle Waters
#14 Grace Ramsden	Scrum-half	#7 Olivia Grace
#8 Armani Sharrock	Prop	#8 Shanelle Mannion
#9 Danielle Bound	Hooker	#9 Charley Blackburn
#2 Amy Johnson	Prop	#10 Brogan Kennedy
#12 Kacy Haley	Second-row	#11 Amie Backhouse
#4 Katie-May Williams	Second-row	#23 Hannah Watts
#11 Amy Daniels (yellow card) 29'	Loose forward	#32 Samantha Watt
#29 Lauren Roberts	interchange	#14 Kirsty Duffield
#16 Georgia Westwood	interchange	#31 Olivia Howarth
#13 Emily Downe	interchange	#4 Gabi Harrison
#17 Claire Mullaney	interchange	#35 Aimee Wallace
