= Kelsey Gentles =

England international rugby league footballer (born 1999)

Personal information
- Full name: Kelsey Jane Alexis Gentles
- Born: 30 January 1999 (age 27) Leeds, England

Playing information
- Position: Wing
Club
Years	Team	Pld	T	G	FG	P
2017–2021	Castleford Tigers
2021–2024	York City Knights
2025	Huddersfield Giants
2026–	Wigan Warriors
	Total	0	0	0	0	0
Representative
Years	Team	Pld	T	G	FG	P
2019–	England

Kelsey Jane Alexis Gentles (born 30 January 1999) is an English international rugby league footballer who plays as a Wing for the Wigan Warriors in the RFL Women's Super League.

== Club career ==
=== Castleford Tigers ===
In 2017, Gentles made her professional debut for the Castleford Tigers. She took part in the Women's Challenge Cup where the Tigers lost to the Leeds Rhinos 20-14. In 2019, she also took part in the Women's Challenge Cup, where they lost to the Rhinos once again in the final. She then won the League Leaders Shield and reached the Grand final with the team that season. She was also nominated for the Woman of Steel award. The award was won by Courtney Winfield-Hill.

=== York City Knights ===
In May 2021, Gentles joined the York City Knights, In her first season with the club, York reached the final of 2021 Challenge Cup and in the league they qualified for the play-off semi-finals. The following season, her club won the inaugural Women's Nines and went on to be the winners of the 2022 Women's Super League Leaders' Shield. After returning from pregnancy, she returned to action, helping York obtain a third-place finish followed by a play-off semi-final win over Leeds Rhinos. On 6 October, York defeated St Helens 18–8 in the Grand Final, which was her first in Gentle's career.

=== Huddersfield Giants and Wigan Warriors ===
In August 2025, after taking time off from a knee injury, Gentles signed with the Huddersfield Giants.

On 17 November 2025, the Wigan Warriors announced that they had signed Gentles.

== International ==
Gentles made her international debut for England in 2019 against Papua New Guinea.

== Personal life ==
Gentles is married to Jamaican international Jacob Ogden. They have one daughter.
