= 2021 Women's Challenge Cup =

Women's rugby league competition

- Duration: 4 rounds
- Number of teams: 10
- Winners: St Helens
- Runners-up: York City Knights

The 2021 Women's Challenge Cup (sponsored as the 2022 Betfred Women's Challenge Cup) was the 9th edition of the rugby league knockout tournament, and the first since the COVID-19 pandemic, with the last edition being played in 2019 as the 2020 edition was cancelled.

The Cup was won by St Helens who beat York City Knights 36–4 in the final at Leigh Sports Village on 5 June 2021. Due to COVID-19 restrictions in the United Kingdom, the Rugby Football League limited entry to the 2021 competition to the 10 clubs playing in the 2021 Women's Super League. A preliminary round saw the two new teams to the Super League, Warrington Wolves and Huddersfield Giants, play each other. York City Knights and Wakefield Trinity who finished 7th and 8th in the 2019 Women's Super League contested the other preliminary round tie. The two winning teams advanced to the quarter-finals where the other six teams joined the competition. The preliminary round and the quarter-finals were played at neutral grounds and behind closed doors due to COVID-19 restrictions.

The final was played on 5 June as part of a triple-header with the semi-finals of the men's tournament. For the first time the final was shown live on TV as it was shown on BBC Two.

== Preliminary round ==
2021 Women's Challenge Cup: preliminary round
Home	Score	Away	Match information
Home	Score	Away	Date and time	Venue	Referee
Warrington Wolves	38–12	Huddersfield Giants	25 April 2021, 12:00	Victoria Park, Warrington	A. Sweet
Wakefield Trinity	10–16	York City Knights	25 April 2021, 15:00	Victoria Park, Warrington

== Quarter-finals ==
The draw for the quarter-finals was made on 28 April. All four ties were played on Sunday 9 May.

2021 Women's Challenge Cup: quarter-finals
Home	Score	Away	Match information
Home	Score	Away	Date and time	Venue	Referee
Warrington Wolves	6–26	Castleford Tigers	9 May 2021, 12:00	Victoria Park, Warrington
York City Knights	30–24	Wigan Warriors	9 May 2021, 12:00	Mobile Rocket Stadium
Leeds Rhinos	70–0	Bradford Bulls	9 May 2021, 15:30	Mobile Rocket Stadium
St Helens	44–10	Featherstone Rovers	9 May 2021, 15:30	Victoria Park, Warrington

== Semi-finals ==
The draw for the semi-finals were made on 9 May. The ties were played on 22 May as a double header at York City Knights' LNER Community Stadium.

Home	Score	Away	Match information
Home	Score	Away	Date and time	Venue	Referee	Attendance (Note: Limited attendance only due to COVID-19 regulations)
York City Knights	32–4	Castleford Tigers	22 May 2021, 12:30	LNER Community Stadium, York	M. Rossleigh	76
St Helens	20–12	Leeds Rhinos	22 May 2021, 15:00	LNER Community Stadium, York	M. Mannifield	76

== Final ==
The final of the women's challenge cup, was played at Leigh Sports Village, on 5 June 2021 as part of a triple header with the semi-finals of the men's tournament.

Home	Score	Away	Match information
Home	Score	Away	Date and time	Venue	Referee	Attendance
York City Knights	6–34	St Helens	5 June 2021, 11:15	Leigh Sports Village	Marcus Griffiths	4,000

== Broadcast matches ==
Round	Match	Date	Broadcast method
Final	York City Knights v St Helens	5 June 2023	Broadcast live on BBC Two

== See also ==
- 2021 Men's Challenge Cup
