= 2026 RFL Women's Super League results =

The fixture list for the 2026 RFL Women's Super League was issued on 26 January 2026. The regular season comprises seven rounds of matches starting on 16 May and ending on 12 July, followed by the teams being split in two groups (the Super Four and the Shield competitions) and playing twice more against each team in their group. The Grand Final took place on 27 September.

== Regular season ==
All times are UK local time (UTC+01:00)

=== Round 1 ===
Betfred Women's Super League: round one
Home	Score	Away	Match information
Home	Score	Away	Date and time	Venue	Referee	Attendance
York Valkyrie	42–0	Huddersfield Giants	16 May 2026, 12:00	York Community Stadium	C. Hughes
Leigh Leopards	34–8	Featherstone Rovers	16 May 2026, 13:00	Leigh Sports Village	T. Topping-Higson
Wigan Warriors	18–10	Leeds Rhinos	16 May 2026, 14:00	Edge Hall Road	A. Williams
Barrow Raiders	6–42	St Helens	17 May 2026, 14:30	Craven Park	S. Harrison

=== Round 2 ===
Betfred Women's Super League: round two
Home	Score	Away	Match information
Home	Score	Away	Date and time	Venue	Referee	Attendance
Leeds Rhinos	60–6	Featherstone Rovers	23 May 2026, 14:00	Headingley Stadium	G. Cox
Leigh Leopards	0–26	Huddersfield Giants	23 May 2026, 14:00	Sutton Park	A. Billington
York Valkyrie	14–18	St Helens	23 May 2026, 17:00	York Community Stadium	A. Belafonte
Barrow Raiders	6–74	Wigan Warriors	24 May 2026, 12:00	Craven Park

=== Round 3 ===
Betfred Women's Super League: round three
Home	Score	Away	Match information
Home	Score	Away	Date and time	Venue	Referee	Attendance
Wigan Warriors	68–4	Leigh Leopards	4 June 2026, 19:00	Edge Hall Road
Featherstone Rovers	16–10	Barrow Raiders	6 June 2026, 14:00	Post Office Road
Leeds Rhinos	30–10	York Valkyrie	6 June 2026, 14:00	Headingley Stadium
St Helens	28–20	Huddersfield Giants	7 June 2026, 15:30	Crusaders Park

=== Round 4 ===
Betfred Women's Super League: round four
Home	Score	Away	Match information
Home	Score	Away	Date and time	Venue	Referee	Attendance
Featherstone Rovers	0–46	St Helens	13 June 2026, 14:00	Post Office Road
Barrow Raiders	6–46	Leeds Rhinos	14 June 2026, 13:30	Craven Park
Huddersfield Giants	12–56	Wigan Warriors	14 June 2026, 14:00	Laund Hill
York Valkyrie	42–0	Leigh Leopards	14 June 2026, 14:30	York St John University Sports Park

=== Round 5 ===
Betfred Women's Super League: round five
Home	Score	Away	Match information
Home	Score	Away	Date and time	Venue	Referee	Attendance
York Valkyrie	12–32	Wigan Warriors	20 June 2026, 12:00	York Community Stadium
Leigh Leopards	20–18	Barrow Raiders	20 June 2026, 13:30	Sutton Park (Note: Super League website gives venue as Leigh Miners Rangers without specifying which location. Rugby Leaguer & League Express reported it as Twist Lane, however, BBC Radio Cumbria match commentary and Leigh Leopards social media gave venue as Sutton Park.)
Huddersfield Giants	38–4	Featherstone Rovers	20 June 2026, 14:00	Laund Hill
St Helens	12–28	Leeds Rhinos	21 June 2026, 12:00	BrewDog Stadium

=== Round 6 ===
Betfred Women's Super League: round six
Home	Score	Away	Match information
Home	Score	Away	Date and time	Venue	Referee	Attendance
Wigan Warriors	32–28	St Helens	27 June 2026, 13:00	Edge Hall Road
Featherstone Rovers	0–44	York Valkyrie	27 June 2026, 14:00
Leeds Rhinos	72–0	Leigh Leopards	27 June 2026, 14:00	Headingley Stadium
Huddersfield Giants	30–24	Barrow Raiders	28 June 2026, 14:00	Laund Hill

=== Round 7 ===
Betfred Women's Super League: round seven
Home	Score	Away	Match information
Home	Score	Away	Date and time	Venue	Referee	Attendance
Wigan Warriors	70–10	Featherstone Rovers	11 July 2026, 14:00	Edge Hall Road
St Helens	58–6 (Note: match abandoned after 62 minutes by the match officials and the St Helens club doctor, due to Leigh sustaining multiple injuries, and the availability of players)	Leigh Leopards	11 July 2026, 14:00	BrewDog Stadium
Huddersfield Giants	10–56	Leeds Rhinos	12 July 2026, 14:00	Laund Hill
Barrow Raiders	12–44	York Valkyrie	12 July 2026, 15:00	Craven Park

== Super Four and Shield competitions ==
=== Round 1 ===
Super Four and Shield: round one
Group	Home	Score	Away	Match Information
Group	Home	Score	Away	Date and Time	Venue	Referee	Attendance
Super 4	St Helens	6–44	Wigan Warriors	6 August 2026, 17:15	BrewDog Stadium	D. Arnold
Super 4	Leeds Rhinos	38–16	York Valkyrie	8 August 2026, 14:00	Headingley Stadium
Shield	Leigh Leopards	4–16	Featherstone Rovers	8 August 2026, 13:00	Leigh Miners Rangers
Shield	Huddersfield Giants	36–20	Barrow Raiders	9 August 2026, 14:00	Laund Hill

=== Round 2 ===
Super Four and Shield: round two
Group	Home	Score	Away	Match Information
Group	Home	Score	Away	Date and Time	Venue	Referee	Attendance
Super 4	St Helens	24–34	Leeds Rhinos	15 August 2026, 12:00	BrewDog Stadium
Super 4	Wigan Warriors	44–0	York Valkyrie	15 August 2026, 12:00	Edge Hall Road
Shield	Leigh Leopards	0–34	Huddersfield Giants	15 August 2026, 13:00	Twist Lane
Shield	Barrow Raiders	14–22	Featherstone Rovers	15 August 2026, 15:00	Craven Park

=== Round 3 ===
Super Four and Shield: round three
Group	Home	Score	Away	Match Information
Group	Home	Score	Away	Date and Time	Venue	Referee	Attendance
Super 4	Wigan Warriors	56–4	St Helens	22 August 2026, 14:00	Edge Hall Road
Super 4	York Valkyrie	18–14	Leeds Rhinos	23 August 2026, 12:00	York Community Stadium
Shield	Barrow Raiders	16–8	Leigh Leopards	23 August 2026, 12:00	Craven Park
Shield	Huddersfield Giants	44–6	Featherstone Rovers	23 August 2026, 14:00	Laund Hill

=== Round 4 ===
Super Four and Shield: round four
Group	Home	Score	Away	Match Information
Group	Home	Score	Away	Date and Time	Venue	Referee	Attendance
Super 4	St Helens	18–28	York Valkyrie	28 August 2026, 17:15	BrewDog Stadium	L. Seal
Super 4	Wigan Warriors	26–20	Leeds Rhinos	29 August 2026, 14:00	Edge Hall Road	R. Schofield
Shield	Barrow Raiders	0–42	Huddersfield Giants	30 August 2026, 14:00	Craven Park
Shield	Featherstone Rovers	30–0	Leigh Leopards	30 August 2026, 14:00	Post Office Road

=== Round 5 ===
Super Four and Shield: round five
Group	Home	Score	Away	Match Information
Group	Home	Score	Away	Date and Time	Venue	Referee	Attendance
Super 4	Leeds Rhinos	12–50	Wigan Warriors	5 September 2026, 17:15	Headingley Stadium
Super 4	York Valkyrie	10–14	St Helens	6 September 2026, 12:00	York Community Stadium
Shield	Featherstone Rovers	36–4	Barrow Raiders	5 September 2026, 14:00	Post Office Road
Shield	Huddersfield Giants	68–0	Leigh Leopards	6 September 2026, 14:00	Laund Hill

=== Round 6 ===
Super Four and Shield: round six
Group	Home	Score	Away	Match Information
Group	Home	Score	Away	Date and Time	Venue	Referee	Attendance
Super 4	Leeds Rhinos	22–24	St Helens	12 September 2026, 14:00	Headingley Stadium
Super 4	York Valkyrie	26–12	Wigan Warriors	13 September 2026, 12:00	York Community Stadium	M. McKelvey
Shield	Leigh Leopards	20–24	Barrow Raiders	12 September 2026, 13:00	Leigh Miners Rangers
Shield	Featherstone Rovers	18–16	Huddersfield Giants	12 September 2026, 14:00	Post Office Road

== Play-offs ==
=== Summary ===
Home	Score	Away	Match Information
Home	Score	Away	Date and time	Venue	Referee	Attendance
Semi-final
Leeds Rhinos	0–12	York Valkyrie	18 September 2026, 17:15	Headingley Stadium	D. Arnold
Grand Final
Wigan Warriors	6–8	York Valkyrie	27 September 2026, 17:30	Brick Community Stadium	A. Moore
