= 2025 RFL Women's Super League results =

The fixture list for the 2025 RFL Women's Super League was issued on 4 December 2024. The regular season comprises 14 rounds of matches starting on 16 May and ending on 14 September.

== Regular season ==
All times are UK local time (UTC+01:00)

=== Round 1 ===
Betfred Women's Super League: round one
Home	Score	Away	Match information
Home	Score	Away	Date and time	Venue	Referee	Attendance
Wigan Warriors	40–6	York Valkyrie	16 May 2025, 17:30	Brick Community Stadium (Note: match was played as part of a double header alongside the men's team.)	F. Lincoln
St Helens	20–20	Leeds Rhinos	17 May 2025, 14:00	Totally Wicked Stadium	O. Salmon
Leigh Leopards	42–10	Barrow Raiders	18 May 2025, 12:00	Leigh Sports Village	A. Billington
Warrington Wolves	30–40	Huddersfield Giants	18 May 2025, 12:00	Halliwell Jones Stadium	T. Topping-Higson

=== Round 2 ===
Betfred Women's Super League: round two
Home	Score	Away	Match information
Home	Score	Away	Date and time	Venue	Referee	Attendance
Leigh Leopards	42–6	Warrington Wolves	24 May 2025, 12:00	Leigh Sports Village	O. Taylor
Huddersfield Giants	0–36	St Helens	25 May 2025, 14:00	Laund Hill	B. Worsley	250
Wigan Warriors	106–6	Barrow Raiders	25 May 2025, 14:00	Robin Park Arena	T. Topping-higson	468
York Valkyrie	24–16	Leeds Rhinos	25 May 2025, 15:00	York Community Stadium	F. Lincoln

=== Round 3 ===
Betfred Women's Super League: round three
Home	Score	Away	Match information
Home	Score	Away	Date and time	Venue	Referee	Attendance
Leeds Rhinos	12–34	Wigan Warriors	31 May 2025, 14:00	Headingley Stadium	L. Seal
York Valkyrie	12–16	St Helens	1 June 2025, 12:00	York Community Stadium	F. Lincoln
Warrington Wolves	6–14	Barrow Raiders	1 June 2025, 13:00	Victoria Park	O. Salmon
Huddersfield Giants	32–6	Leigh Leopards	1 June 2025, 14:00	Laund Hill	A. Sweet

=== Round 4 ===
Betfred Women's Super League: round four
Home	Score	Away	Match information
Home	Score	Away	Date and time	Venue	Referee	Attendance
Barrow Raiders	6–40	St Helens	14 June 2025, 14:00	Craven Park	L. Breheny
Leigh Leopards	0–26	York Valkyrie	14 June 2025, 14:00	Leigh Sports Village	O. Salmon
Huddersfield Giants	0–58	Wigan Warriors	15 June 2025, 15:00	Laund Hill	M. McKelvey	220
Leeds Rhinos	110–0	Warrington Wolves	15 June 2025, 15:00	Headingley Stadium	G. Cox

=== Round 5 ===
Betfred Women's Super League: round five
Home	Score	Away	Match information
Home	Score	Away	Date and time	Venue	Referee	Attendance
St Helens	86–0	Warrington Wolves	21 June 2025, 15:00	Totally Wicked Stadium
Leeds Rhinos	66–4	Barrow Raiders	22 June 2025, 12:00	Headingley Stadium
Huddersfield Giants	20–24	York Valkyrie	22 June 2025, 14:00	Laund Hill
Wigan Warriors	60–6	Leigh Leopards	22 June 2025, 14:00	Robin Park Arena		938

=== Round 6 ===
Betfred Women's Super League: round six
Home	Score	Away	Match information
Home	Score	Away	Date and time	Venue	Referee	Attendance
Leeds Rhinos	48–12	Leigh Leopards	27 June 2025, 17:15	Headingley Stadium
Barrow Raiders	12–32	Huddersfield Giants	29 June 2025, 12:00	Craven Park
Warrington Wolves	0–70	York Valkyrie	29 June 2025, 12:00	Victoria Park
Wigan Warriors	22–22	St Helens	29 June 2025, 14:00	Robin Park Arena		1,228 (Note: a new record attendance for a women's super league game at Robin Park Arena)

=== Round 7 ===
Betfred Women's Super League: round seven
Home	Score	Away	Match information
Home	Score	Away	Date and time	Venue	Referee	Attendance
Leeds Rhinos	20–22	St Helens	11 July 2025, 17:30	Headingley Stadium
Barrow Raiders	52–10	Warrington Wolves	13 July 2025, 12:00	Craven Park
York Valkyrie	28–4	Leigh Leopards	13 July 2025, 12:00	York Community Stadium
Wigan Warriors	76–0	Huddersfield Giants	13 July 2025, 14:00	Robin Park Arena

=== Round 8 ===
Betfred Women's Super League: round eight
Home	Score	Away	Match information
Home	Score	Away	Date and time	Venue	Referee	Attendance
St Helens	80–0	Leigh Leopards	19 July 2025, 14:00	Totally Wicked Stadium
Warrington Wolves	0–80	Wigan Warriors	20 July 2025, 12:00	Victoria Park
York Valkyrie	58–0	Barrow Raiders	20 July 2025, 12:00	York Community Stadium
Leeds Rhinos	54–12	Huddersfield Giants	20 July 2025, 15:00	Headingley Stadium

=== Round 9 ===
Betfred Women's Super League: round nine
Home	Score	Away	Match information
Home	Score	Away	Date and time	Venue	Referee	Attendance
Warrington Wolves	0–48	St Helens	—N/a (Note: Match forfeited by Warrington Wolves. Awarded as a 48–0 win to St Helens.)
Barrow Raiders	16–10	Leigh Leopards	27 July 2025, 14:00	Craven Park
Wigan Warriors	30–16	Leeds Rhinos	27 July 2025, 14:00	Robin Park Arena
York Valkyrie	26–6	Huddersfield Giants	27 July 2025, 15:00	York Community Stadium

=== Round 10 ===
Betfred Women's Super League: round ten
Home	Score	Away	Match information
Home	Score	Away	Date and time	Venue	Referee	Attendance
Barrow Raiders	0–78	Leeds Rhinos	17 August 2025, 12:00	Craven Park
York Valkyrie	86–0	Warrington Wolves	17 August 2025, 12:00	York Community Stadium
Leigh Leopards	0–72	Wigan Warriors	17 August 2025, 14:00	Leigh Sports Village
St Helens	48–0	Huddersfield Giants	17 August 2025, 14:00	Totally Wicked Stadium

=== Round 11 ===
Betfred Women's Super League: round eleven
Home	Score	Away	Match information
Home	Score	Away	Date and time	Venue	Referee	Attendance
St Helens	90–0	Barrow Raiders	23 August 2025, 14:00	Totally Wicked Stadium
Leigh Leopards	10–40	Leeds Rhinos	24 August 2025, 13:00	Leigh Sports Village
York Valkyrie	32–10	Wigan Warriors	24 August 2025, 13:00	Crow Trees Ground (Note: match to be played as part of a double header, alongside Newcastle Thunder vs Whitehaven)
Huddersfield Giants	54–4	Warrington Wolves	24 August 2025, 14:00	Laund Hill

=== Round 12 ===
Betfred Women's Super League: round twelve
Home	Score	Away	Match information
Home	Score	Away	Date and time	Venue	Referee	Attendance
Leigh Leopards	20–20	Huddersfield Giants	30 August 2025, 12:00	Leigh Sports Village
St Helens	18–8	York Valkyrie	30 August 2025, 12:00	Totally Wicked Stadium
Barrow Raiders	0–92	Wigan Warriors	30 August 2025, 14:00	Craven Park
Warrington Wolves	0–48	Leeds Rhinos	—N/a (Note: Match forfeited by Warrington Wolves. Awarded as a 48–0 win to Leeds.)

=== Round 13 ===
Betfred Women's Super League: round thirteen
Home	Score	Away	Match information
Home	Score	Away	Date and time	Venue	Referee	Attendance
St Helens	20–24	Wigan Warriors	5 September 2025, 17:30 (Note: match to be played as part of a double header, alongside the men's teams)	Totally Wicked Stadium
Warrington Wolves	0–48	Leigh Leopards	C–C (Note: On 5 September, Warrington announced, that they had taken the decision to withdraw from the remainder of the season due to player injuries and availability. The remaining two fixtures against Leigh, and Wigan are awarded as 48–0 wins respectively, and therefore confirms Warrington are officially relegated.)
Barrow Raiders	6–48	York Valkyrie	7 September 2025, 14:00	Craven Park
Huddersfield Giants	4–28	Leeds Rhinos	7 September 2025, 14:00	Laund Hill

=== Round 14 ===
Betfred Women's Super League: round fourteen
Home	Score	Away	Match information
Home	Score	Away	Date and time	Venue	Referee	Attendance
Leigh Leopards	0–44	St Helens	14 September 2025, 13:00	Leigh Sports Village
Huddersfield Giants	48–6	Barrow Raiders	14 September 2025, 14:00	Laund Hill
Wigan Warriors	48–0	Warrington Wolves	C–C
Leeds Rhinos	30–14	York Valkyrie	14 September 2025, 15:00	AMT Headingley Stadium

== Play-offs ==
=== Summary ===
Home	Score	Away	Match Information
Home	Score	Away	Date and time	Venue	Referee	Attendance
Semi Finals
St Helens	12–8	York Valkyrie	21 September 2025, 17:00	Totally Wicked Stadium	F. Lincoln
Wigan Warriors	38–0	Leeds Rhinos	21 September 2025, 19:30	Brick Community Stadium	Tara Jones
Grand Final
Wigan Warriors	16–12	St Helens	5 October 2025, 17:00	Brick Community Stadium
