= Hollie-Mae Dodd =

England international rugby league footballer

Personal information
- Born: 26 July 2003 (age 23) Castleford, West Yorkshire, England

Playing information
- Position: Second-row, Centre
Club
| Years | Team | Pld | T | G | FG | P |
|---|---|---|---|---|---|---|
| 2019–21 | Castleford Tigers | | 4 | | | 28 |
| 2022–23 | York Valkyrie | 4 | 4 | 0 | 0 | 16 |
| 2023– | Canberra Raiders | 33 | 6 | 0 | 0 | 24 |
| | Total | 37 | 14 | 0 | 0 | 68 |
Representative
| Years | Team | Pld | T | G | FG | P |
| 2020– | Yorkshire | 2 | 0 | 0 | 0 | 0 |
| 2021–26 | England | 14 | 9 | 0 | 0 | 36 |
- Source: As of 19 November 2026

Hollie-Mae Dodd (born 26 July 2003) is an England international rugby league player. Dodd plays for Canberra Raiders in the NRL Women's Premiership having previously played for York Valkyrie and Castleford Tigers in the Women's Super League. Dodd plays as a second-row or a centre.

== Background ==
Dodd was a student at Castleford Academy where she was player in school teams that reached four Champion Schools finals between 2015 and 2018 and won three of them (runners up in 2017). Dodd scored tries in each of the finals: 2015 (3), 2016 (2), 2017 (2) and 2018 (2).

== Playing career ==
=== Castleford Tigers ===
Dodd played for Castleford Tigers making her debut in the final of the 2019 Women's Challenge Cup on 27 July 2019. The match was the day after her 16th birthday and made Dodd the youngest player, female or male, to appear in a Challenge Cup final. The same season, Castleford won the Super League league leaders' shield and went on to reach the Super League grand final only to have the disappointment of losing to Leeds again, with Dodd playing at second-row.

Playing for Castleford she helps the team to finish the Super League season in fifth place and to reach the play-off semi-finals.

=== York Valkyrie ===
In December 2021 Dodd left Castleford to join York City Knights (who became York Valkyrie in 2022). During the 2022 season Dodd was part of the York side that won the league leaders' shield and reached the grand final. Dodd played in the grand final where the team lost to Leeds Rhinos. Dodd was named the Super League Young Player of the Year at the end of season awards in September 2022.

=== Canberra Raiders ===
In April 2023 Dodd signed for Canberra Raiders in the NRL Women's Premiership becoming the first English player signed for a club in the competition. On 6 August, Dodd became the first English player to score a try in the NRLW as the Raiders won 28–22 over Wests Tigers. In September, Dodd suffered a knee injury in the game against North Queensland Cowboys and missed the remainder of the 2023 season. In the 2024 season, Dodd made eight appearances for the Raiders and in December 2024 signed for a further two years at the club.

== Representative ==
=== Yorkshire ===
In March 2020, Dodd represented Yorkshire in the pre-season Origin Series against Lancashire.

In October 2024, Dodd represented Yorkshire against Lancashire,

=== England ===
During the 2021 season she made her England debut scoring a try in a 60–0 win over Wales in June. A second England appearance was made in October against France. Two further England caps were won, in the 2022 mid-season internationals against Wales and France, with Dodd scoring a try in each.

In September 2022, Dodd was named in the England squad for the World Cup.

On 2 November 2024, Dodd scored for a try for England in their 82–0 win over Wales.

On 2 March 2025, Dodd was a part of the England side that faced the Australian Jillaroos in a historic test at Allegiant Stadium in Las Vegas. The Jillaroos won 90–4.

In September 2026, Dodd was selected for the England squad for the 2026 World Cup. On 19 November, Dodd was named in the team of the tournament.
