= Danika Priim =

England international rugby league player & commentator

Personal information
- Born: 11 September 1984 (age 42) Leeds, West Yorkshire, England

Playing information
- Position: Prop
Club
| Years | Team | Pld | T | G | FG | P |
|---|---|---|---|---|---|---|
| 2015–16 | Stanningley |
| 2017 | Bradford Bulls Women |
| 2018–21 | Leeds Rhinos Women | 29 | 3 | 0 | 0 | 12 |
| | Total | 29 | 3 | 0 | 0 | 12 |
Representative
| Years | Team | Pld | T | G | FG | P |
| 2015–18 | England |

Danika Priim (born 11 September 1984) is an English retired rugby league player. She played for Stanningley, and Bradford Bulls, before playing for her home town team, Leeds Rhinos in the Women's Super League between 2018 and 2021. Priim played at prop forward. Priim played at international level for England from 2015 with her last international appearance being in 2018.

Born in Leeds, Priim studied PE, and qualified as a teacher at Leeds Beckett University. She played rugby union for the university, but did not return to rugby league until 2015 when she joined Stanningley. While at Stanningley, Priim was selected to play for England, and made her debut in the 24–4 victory over France on 17 June 2015.

In 2017 Priim moved to Bradford Bulls for the inaugural Women's Super League season, and was a member of the squad that won both the league title, and the Challenge Cup, although she missed the Challenge Cup Final due to injury, missed the Super League Grand Final, to ensure she was fit to play for England in the 2017 Women's Rugby League World Cup. Selected by England for the 2017 World Cup, Priim had to take several weeks unpaid leave from her teaching post as England reached the semi-finals.

The following year, Priim left Bradford to join the newly-formed Leeds Rhinos, where she was appointed vice-captain. In their first season, Leeds made both the Grand Final, and the Challenge Cup final, but an anterior cruciate ligament injury meant that she missed both games. An appearance in a major final finally came, when she was part of the Rhinos successful retention of the Challenge Cup against Castleford in July 2019. The season ended with her second major final appearance, as Leeds lifted the Super League trophy, beating Castleford in the Grand Final.

Priim played her last game for Leeds in the defeat to St Helens in the 2021 Grand Final, and announced her retirement from playing the following week.

Since 2020, Priim has appeared as a commentator and summarizer on both Sky TV, and BBC TV and radio.

In 2024, Prim was elected as vice president for the RFL, where she will work alongside Adam Hills (who will take over as president from Sir Lindsay Hoyle).

In February 2025, Priim was charged with a single offence of sexual assault. On 20 February, it was announced that she had voluntarily stood down as vice president of the RFL until further notice. At a preliminary hearing at Leeds Crown Court on 13 March 2025 Priim pleaded not guilty to the offence and was bailed until the trial date which was set for 16 November 2026.. On 19 November 2026, following a three-day trial, she was acquitted of the offence.
