= 2019 RFL Women's Super League =

Women's rugby league competition in Great Britain

2019 Women's Super League
- Duration: 14 rounds
- Teams: 8
- Matches played: 59
- Champions: Leeds Rhinos
- League Leaders Shield: Castleford Tigers
- Biggest home win: Castleford Tigers 74–8 Featherstone Rovers (1 September 2019)
- Biggest away win: York City Knights 0–80 Castleford Tigers Women (7 April 2019)
- Woman of Steel: Courtney Hill

The 2019 RFL Women's Super League, known as the Betfred Women's Super League for sponsorship reasons, was the third season of the Rugby League Women's Super League for female players in clubs affiliated to the Rugby Football League.

The champions were Leeds Rhinos who beat Castleford Tigers 20–12 in the Grand Final on 11 October 2019. Castleford Tigers won the league leaders shield, a 44–0 win over York City Knights in round 13 put them three points clear of nearest rivals, St Helens, with a round to spare.

For 2019, the number of teams was expanded from seven to eight, with the addition of Wakefield Trinity to the league.

The season comprised 14 rounds, with each team playing each other home and away, commencing on 7 April and ending on 29 September. Following the regular season, the top four teams played off against each other in two semi-finals, with the Grand Final played on Friday 11 October, at the Totally Wicked Stadium in St Helens and broadcast live on Sky Sports.

On 15 August 2019 it was announced that Betfred would become the sponsors of the league with immediate effect in a deal that will run until the end of the 2021 season.

The defending champions were Wigan Warriors, who beat League Leaders Shield winners Leeds Rhinos, 18–16 at the Grand Final at the Manchester Regional Arena. Wigan were eliminated from the play-offs after they lost 34–4 to Castleford Tigers in the semifinals.

== Teams ==
| Colours | Club | Location |
|---|---|---|
| | Bradford Bulls | Bradford, West Yorkshire |
| | Castleford Tigers | Castleford, West Yorkshire |
| | Featherstone Rovers | Featherstone, West Yorkshire |
| | Leeds Rhinos | Leeds, West Yorkshire |
| | St Helens | St Helens, Merseyside |
| | Wakefield Trinity | Wakefield, West Yorkshire |
| | Wigan Warriors | Wigan, Greater Manchester |
| | York City Knights | York, North Yorkshire |

== Fixtures and results ==
=== Round 1 ===
| Home | Score | Away | Match Information |
| Home | Score | Away | Date and Time | Venue |
|---|---|---|---|---|
| Bradford Bulls | 38–16 | Featherstone Rovers | 7 April 2019, 12:45pm | Odsal Stadium |
| Leeds Rhinos | 54–4 | Wakefield Trinity | 7 April 2019, 1:00pm | Sports Park, Weetwood |
| Wigan Warriors | 4–6 | St Helens | 7 April 2019, 1:00pm | Robin Park Arena |
| York City Knights | 0–80 | Castleford Tigers | 7 April 2019, 2:00pm | York St John University Sports Park |

=== Round 2 ===
| Home | Score | Away | Match Information |
| Home | Score | Away | Date and Time | Venue |
|---|---|---|---|---|
| Featherstone Rovers | 16–24 | Leeds Rhinos | 14 April 2019, 1:30pm | LD Nutrition Stadium |
| Wigan Warriors | 14–36 | Castleford Tigers | 14 April 2019, 2:00pm | Orrell St James |
| York City Knights | 6–10 | Wakefield Trinity | 14 April 2019, 2:00pm | York St John University Sports Park |
| St Helens | 24–0 | Bradford Bulls | 22 April 2019, 12:00pm | Totally Wicked Stadium |

=== Round 3 ===
| Home | Score | Away | Match Information |
| Home | Score | Away | Date and Time | Venue |
|---|---|---|---|---|
| Bradford Bulls | 60–6 | Wakefield Trinity | 28 April 2019, 12:30pm | Odsal Stadium |
| Castleford Tigers | 27–0 | Leeds Rhinos | 28 April 2019, 1:00pm | Mend-A-Hose Jungle |
| York City Knights | 0–62 | Wigan Warriors | 28 April 2019, 2:00pm | York St John University Sports Park |
| St Helens | 54–16 | Featherstone Rovers | 28 April 2019, 5:45pm | Totally Wicked Stadium |

=== Round 4 ===
| Home | Score | Away | Match Information |
| Home | Score | Away | Date and Time | Venue |
|---|---|---|---|---|
| Wigan Warriors | 4–12 | Leeds Rhinos | 12 May 2019, 1:00pm | Robin Park Arena |
| Castleford Tigers | 30–14 | St Helens | 12 May 2019, 2:00pm | Mend-A-Hose Jungle |
| Wakefield Trinity | 8–40 | Featherstone Rovers | 12 May 2019, 2:00pm | The Mobile Rocket Stadium |
| York City Knights | 4–38 | Bradford Bulls | 12 May 2019, 2:00pm | York St John University Sports Park |

=== Round 5 ===
| Home | Score | Away | Match Information |
| Home | Score | Away | Date and Time | Venue |
|---|---|---|---|---|
| York City Knights | 0–50 | Leeds Rhinos | 2 June 2019, 12:00pm | York St John University Sports Park |
| Wakefield Trinity | 0–66 | St Helens | 2 June 2019, 2:00pm | Mobile Rocket Stadium |
| Wigan Warriors | 42–4 | Featherstone Rovers | 2 June 2019, 2:00pm | Robin Park Arena |
| Bradford Bulls | 22–42 | Castleford Tigers | 6 June 2019, 7:30pm | Odsal Stadium |

=== Round 6 ===
| Home | Score | Away | Match Information |
| Home | Score | Away | Date and Time | Venue |
|---|---|---|---|---|
| Bradford Bulls | 6–18 | Leeds Rhinos | 30 June 2019, 12:30pm | Odsal Stadium |
| Wakefield Trinity | 6–44 | Wigan Warriors | 30 June 2019, 1:00pm | Mobile Rocket Stadium |
| Featherstone Rovers | 20–46 | Castleford Tigers | 30 June 2019, 2:00pm | LD Nutrition Stadium |
| St Helens | 60–6 | York City Knights | 30 June 2019, 3:00pm | Totally Wicked Stadium |

=== Round 7 ===
| Home | Score | Away | Match Information |
| Home | Score | Away | Date and Time | Venue |
|---|---|---|---|---|
| Leeds Rhinos | 16–30 | St Helens | 21 July 2019, 12:30pm | Headingley |
| Bradford Bulls | 16–20 | Wigan Warriors | 21 July 2019, 1:00pm | Odsal Stadium |
| Castleford Tigers | 54–8 | Wakefield Trinity | 21 July 2019, 5:00pm | Mend-A-Hose Jungle |
| Featherstone Rovers | 18–16 | York City Knights | 22 September 2019, 2:00pm | LD Nutrition Stadium |

=== Round 8 ===
| Home | Score | Away | Match Information |
| Home | Score | Away | Date and Time | Venue |
|---|---|---|---|---|
| Castleford Tigers | 50–16 | Bradford Bulls | 4 August 2019, 1:00pm | Mend-A-Hose Jungle |
| Featherstone Rovers | 18–16 | Wigan Warriors | 4 August 2019, 1:00pm | LD Nutrition Stadium |
| Leeds Rhinos | 30–0 (Note: Match abandoned after 39 minutes due to Sophie Robinson suffering a serious leg injury. The score at the time was 30–0, after consultation with both clubs the RFL decided not to order the game to be replayed with the score at the time of abandonment to stand as the result.) | York City Knights | 4 August 2019, 1:00pm | Sports Park, Weetwood |
| St Helens | 60–0 | Wakefield Trinity | 4 August 2019, 5:00pm | Totally Wicked Stadium |

=== Round 9 ===
| Home | Score | Away | Match Information |
| Home | Score | Away | Date and Time | Venue |
|---|---|---|---|---|
| Bradford Bulls | 18–32 | St Helens | 11 August 2019, 1:00pm | Odsal Stadium |
| Castleford Tigers | 56–8 | Wigan Warriors | 11 April 2019, 1:00pm | Mend-A-Hose Jungle |
| Leeds Rhinos | 52–0 | Featherstone Rovers | 11 August 2019, 1:00pm | Sports Park, Westwood |
| Wakefield Trinity | 4–20 | York City Knights | 11 August 2019, 2:00pm | Sharlston Rovers |

=== Round 10 ===
| Home | Score | Away | Match Information |
| Home | Score | Away | Date and Time | Venue |
|---|---|---|---|---|
| Leeds Rhinos | 26–36 | Castleford Tigers | 17 August 2019, 1:00pm | Emerald Headingley |
| Wakefield Trinity | 4–48 | Bradford Bulls | 18 August 2019, 1:00pm | The Mobile Rocket Stadium |
| Featherstone Rovers | 7–50 | St Helens | 18 August 2019, 2:00pm | L D Nutrition Stadium |
| Wigan Warriors | 42–0 | York City Knights | 18 August 2019, 2:00pm | Robin Park Arena |

=== Round 11 ===
| Home | Score | Away | Match Information |
| Home | Score | Away | Date and Time | Venue |
|---|---|---|---|---|
| Castleford Tigers | 74–8 | Featherstone Rovers | 1 September 2019, 1:00pm | Mend-A-Hose Jungle |
| York City Knights | 0–56 | St Helens | 1 September 2019, 1:00pm | York St John University |
| Wigan Warriors | 52–6 | Wakefield Trinity | 1 September 2019, 2:00pm | Robin Park Arena |

=== Round 12 ===
| Home | Score | Away | Match Information |
| Home | Score | Away | Date and Time | Venue |
|---|---|---|---|---|
| Wakefield Trinity | 4–36 | Castleford Tigers | 8 September 2019, 1:00pm | The Mobile Rocket Stadium |
| Wigan Warriors | 20–20 | Bradford Bulls | 8 September 2019, 2:00pm | Robin Park Arena |
| York City Knights | 16–26 | Featherstone Rovers | 8 September 2019, 2:00pm | York St John University |
| St Helens | 20–20 | Leeds Rhinos | 8 September 2019, 3:00pm | Ruskin Park |

=== Round 13 ===
| Home | Score | Away | Match Information |
| Home | Score | Away | Date and Time | Venue |
|---|---|---|---|---|
| Wakefield Trinity | 4–66 | Leeds Rhinos | 14 September 2019, 1:00pm | The Mobile Rocket Stadium |
| Featherstone Rovers | 22–14 | Bradford Bulls | 15 September 2019, 2:00pm | L D Nutrition Stadium |
| St Helens | 28–0 | Wigan Warriors | 15 September 2019, 2:00pm | Ruskin Park |
| Castleford Tigers | 44–0 | York City Knights | 17 September 2019, 7:00pm | Mend-A-Hose Jungle |

=== Round 14 ===
| Home | Score | Away | Match Information |
| Home | Score | Away | Date and Time | Venue |
|---|---|---|---|---|
| Featherstone Rovers | 26–0 | Wakefield Trinity | 29 September 2019, 1:00pm | LD Nutrition Stadium |
| Bradford Bulls | P–P (Note: match postponed, pitch unplayable due to heavy rain) | York City Knights | 29 September 2019, 2:00pm | Neil Hunt Memorial Ground |
| Leeds Rhinos | 16–0 | Wigan Warriors | 29 September 2019, 2:15pm | Weetwood Sports Park |
| St Helens | 20–14 | Castleford Tigers | 29 September 2019, 3:00pm | Ruskin Park |

== Regular season standings ==
| Pos | Team | Pld | W | D | L | PF | PA | PD | Pts | Qualification |
|---|---|---|---|---|---|---|---|---|---|---|
| 1 | Castleford Tigers | 14 | 13 | 0 | 1 | 625 | 160 | +465 | 26 | League Leaders Shield/Play off semi-finals |
| 2 | St Helens | 14 | 12 | 1 | 1 | 522 | 131 | +391 | 25 | Play-off semi-finals |
| 3 | Leeds Rhinos | 14 | 10 | 1 | 3 | 410 | 151 | +259 | 21 | Play-off semi-finals |
| 4 | Wigan Warriors | 14 | 6 | 1 | 7 | 328 | 224 | +104 | 13 | Play-off semi-finals |
| 5 | Featherstone Rovers | 14 | 6 | 0 | 8 | 237 | 450 | −213 | 12 | |
| 6 | Bradford Bulls | 13 | 4 | 1 | 8 | 300 | 282 | +18 | 9 | |
| 7 | York City Knights | 13 | 1 | 0 | 12 | 68 | 522 | −454 | 2 | |
| 8 | Wakefield Trinity | 14 | 1 | 0 | 13 | 64 | 634 | −570 | 2 | |

== Play-offs ==
=== semi-finals ===
| Home | Score | Away | Match Information |
| Home | Score | Away | Date and Time | Venue | Referee |
|---|---|---|---|---|---|
| Castleford Tigers | 34–4 | Wigan Warriors | 6 October 2019, 13:00 | Mend-A-Hose Jungle |
| St Helens | 14–18 | Leeds Rhinos | 6 October 2019, 13:00 | Totally Wicked Stadium | A. Moore |

=== Grand final ===
11 October 2019
19:30

| Castleford Tigers | 12–20 | Leeds Rhinos |
|---|---|---|
| Tries: Lumb, Owen, Gentles; Goals: Stanley 0/3 | report | Tries: Goldthorp 2, Eatock, Frain; Goals: Hill 2/4 |

Totally Wicked Stadium
Attendance: 1,673
Referee: Greg Dolan

| Castleford Tigers | Position | Leeds Rhinos |
|---|---|---|
| #1 Tara Stanley | Fullback | #1 Caitlin Beevers |
| #16 Maisie Lumb | Wing | #15 Sophie Nuttall |
| #24 Lucy Eastwood | Centre | #30 Abby Eatock |
| #12 Lacey Owen | Centre | #16 Chloe Karrigan |
| #4 Kelsey Gentles | Wing | #24 Fran Goldthorp |
| #6 Georgia Roche | Stand-off | #6 Hannah Butcher |
| #33 Jasmine Cudjoe | Scrum-half | #7 Courtney Hill (c) |
| #10 Grace Field | Prop | #10 Danielle Anderson |
| #9 Sinead Peach | Hooker | #14 Tasha Gaines |
| #68 Shona Hoyle | Prop | #13 Amy Johnson |
| #28 Hollie Dodd | Second-row | #11 Aimee Staveley |
| #11 Tamzin Renouf | Second-row | #4 Charlotte Booth |
| #13 Rhiannon Marshall | Loose forward | #28 Paige Webster |
| #14 Sammy Watts | interchange | #27 Keara Bennett |
| #8 Emma Lumley | interchange | #19 Elle Frain |
| #31 Frankie Townend | interchange | #8 Danika Priim |
| #44 Emma Slowe | interchange | #22 Elle Oldroyd |

Leeds completed a league and cup double with 20–12 victory over Castleford in the Grand Final on 11 October 2019. In a game televised live on Sky Sports Castleford took an early advantage with two tries in the first five minute; the scorers being Maisie Lumb and Lacey Owen. Leeds pulled a try back through Abby Eatock and these were the only points of the first half with the half-time score being 8–4 to Castleford.

In the second half, it was Leeds who proved to be the stronger side with three tries in close succession, two for 16-year old winger Fran Goldthorp and one for Elle Frain. Leeds captain Courtney Hill converted two of the tries to give Leeds a 20–8 lead. Kelsey Gentles did score a late try for Castleford to make the score 20–12 but it was too late for Castleford to catch up.

== End of season awards ==
Courtney Hill (Leeds Rhinos) was named as the Woman of Steel at the end of season awards.
