= Wakefield Trinity Women =

Wakefield Trinity
Club information
- Full name: Wakefield Trinity Rugby League Football Club
- Colours: Red, White and Blue
- Founded: 2016; 10 years ago
- Website: Official website

Current details
- Competition: National League One
- 2026: 1st

Records
- League Leaders (Championship): 1 (2018)

Wakefield Trinity Women are the women's rugby league team of Wakefield Trinity in Wakefield, England. They were founded in 2016 as Wakefield Trinity Ladies and between 2018 and 2022 they played in the Super League. As of 2026, they compete in Northern League One, the third tier of women's rugby league in Britain.

== History ==
In July 2016, it was announced that the women's team for Wakefield Trinity was being established and would be based at Sharlston Rovers ARLFC for its home ground and that this would also provide its training facilities. They were the first women's team to be linked with a men's Super League team and this came with the benefit that the team could play some of its matches as double headers for the men's team at Belle Vue stadium. The team planned to take part in the 2017 Summer League and began by organising pre-season friendlies against teams from the WRLA Winter League including Hull Wyke, East Leeds and West Leeds Eagles. Their first win, a 10–0 victory over East Leeds, was played in September at Belle Vue before the men's match against Catalans Dragons.

In March 2017, Wakefield entered the Premier Division until this was discontinued in July when the league was restructured. They then joined the Championship but missed out on the play-offs by finishing fifth after losing their final match of the season. They were also unsuccessful in the Challenge Cup and Shield, losing in the first round of each competition. During pre-season for the 2018 season the club stated their intention to join the Super League in 2019. They started their 2018 campaign with a 40–10 win over Hull FC, and remained unbeaten until a loss to Leeds Rhinos in the Challenge Cup. They also reached the semi-final of the Challenge Shield before losing to Bradford Bulls. Wakefield finished the season as league leaders with 11 wins from their 14 games. The league standings were determined by points difference with Wakefield taking top spot by a margin of just two points at the expense of Stanningley. However, Stanningley went on to win the grand final after Wakefield lost to Leigh Miners Rangers in the play-off semi-finals.

In 2019, Wakefield joined the Super League and made the competition up to eight teams. They finished bottom of the table with their only league win coming in round two at York City Knights and their Challenge Cup run was ended in the semi-final with a 0–100 loss to Castleford Tigers. Following the cancellation of the 2020 season Wakefield had an unsuccessful 2021 league campaign and lost to York in the first round of the Challenge Cup. The 2022 season began with a 32–10 win over Castleford in the Challenge Cup, before a 14–12 loss to the Oulton Raidettes saw Wakefield knocked out at the group stage. In 2022, Wakefield were placed in Group 2 of the Super League where they recorded only one win, a 8–4 victory over Castleford, and finished bottom of the table.

The 2023 season saw Wakefield return to the Championship. In April 2023, the club announced the launch of a girls' development academy, with the aim of encouraging potential new players. In 2024, Wakefield entered League One following the restructuring of the women's national pyramid. In September 2024, it was announced that the running of the team, which had been operated by the Wakefield Trinity Community Foundation, was to be integrated into the Wakefield Trinity club. In July 2025, Wakefield defeated Leamington Royals 19–0 to win the Shield final at the RFL Women's Nines tournament. In the 2025 League One season, Wakefield finished in second place and reached the Grand Final which they lost to Widnes Vikings. In 2026, Wakefield went through the regular season unbeaten to finish top of National League One with nine wins from their ten matches. Their only draw came against Workington Town who went on to defeat Wakefield 24–12 in the Grand Final.

== Seasons ==
| Season | League | | | | | | | | | Play-offs | Challenge Cup | Refs |
| Season | Division | P | W | D | L | F | A | Pts | Pos | Play-offs | Challenge Cup | Refs |
|---|---|---|---|---|---|---|---|---|---|---|---|---|
| 2017 | Championship | 6 | 2 | 1 | 3 | 110 | 114 | 5 | 5th | —N/a | R1 | |
| 2018 | Championship | 14 | 11 | 0 | 3 | 390 | 126 | 22 | 1st | Lost in Semi-final | R1 | |
| 2019 | Super League | 14 | 1 | 0 | 13 | 64 | 634 | 2 | 8th | —N/a | SF | |
| 2020 | Super League | Cancelled due to the COVID-19 pandemic | | | | | | | | | | |
| 2021 | Super League | 7 | 0 | 0 | 7 | 50 | 334 | 0 | 10th | —N/a | R1 | |
| 2021 | Shield | 4 | 0 | 0 | 4 | 6 | 252 | 0 | 5th | —N/a | R1 | |
| 2022 | Super League (G2) | 12 | 1 | 0 | 11 | 68 | 586 | 2 | 7th | —N/a | GS | |
| 2023 | Championship | 18 | 1 | 0 | 17 | 68 | 932 | -1 | 9th | —N/a | —N/a | |
| 2024 | League One | 14 | 0 | 0 | 14 | 82 | 684 | -1 | 8th | —N/a | —N/a | |
| 2025 | League One | 14 | 11 | 0 | 3 | 440 | 188 | 22 | 2nd | Lost in Grand Final | —N/a | |
| 2026 | Northern League One | 10 | 9 | 0 | 1 | 384 | 72 | 19 | 1st | Lost in Grand Final | —N/a | |

== Honours ==
- RFL Women's Championship:
  - League Leaders: 2018
