= 2021 RFL Women's Super League =

Women's rugby league competition in Great Britain

2021 Women's Super League
- Teams: 10
- Matches played: 36
- Points scored: 1,910
- Champions: St Helens
- League Leaders Shield: St Helens
- Runners-up: Leeds Rhinos
- Biggest home win: St Helens 90–0 Huddersfield Giants (2 May 2021)
- Biggest away win: Bradford Bulls 0–86 St Helens (18 April 2021)
- Woman of Steel: Jodie Cunningham

The 2021 RFL Women's Super League (also known as the Betfred Women's Super League for sponsorship reasons) was the fifth season of the Rugby League Women's Super League for female players in clubs affiliated to the Rugby Football League (RFL).

The title was won by St Helens who beat Leeds Rhinos 28–0 in the Grand Final at Headingley on 10 October. The victory sealed a treble for St Helens as they also won the League Leaders Shield and the Challenge Cup.

The defending champions were Leeds Rhinos who beat Castleford Tigers 20–12 in the 2019 Grand Final on 11 October 2019; the 2020 competition having been cancelled due to the COVID-19 pandemic.

The league comprised the same ten teams who were due to play in the 2020 competition. The competition started on 18 April 2021. It was originally announced that the first ten rounds of the competition would all be played behind closed doors at just two venues; Victoria Park in Warrington and Weetwood Sports Ground in Leeds, but by round three other venues such as Belle Vue in Wakefield were being used, although all rounds were played as double-headers utilising two venues per round. Part way through the first part of the season Featherstone Rover's Post Office Road and Bradford Bulls' Odsal Stadium were also used to host matches.

The schedule for the season was originally planned for a ten round regular season, after which, the top four teams would then split off into a six-round play-off structure, with each team playing the others home and away. The two teams who finished top of the play-off table would compete in the Grand Final. The six teams that did not make the play-offs will play each other once in the Shield competition. The top four teams after the round-robin phase, would meet in two semi-finals with the two winners playing in the Shield Final.

On 22 July 2021, the RFL announced that, after discussion with all ten teams, the regular season would stop after the nine rounds already played, and all ten teams would then take a two week mid-season break, with the play-off and Shield competitions starting in August. The other change to the play off structure was, instead of the top four teams competing for the grand final, it would now be competed by five teams rather than four and six. The change was made to allow teams to respond to ongoing issues connected with the ongoing COVID-19 pandemic, and injuries sustained during the first part of the season.

For the first time since the inception of the league, regular games were broadcast live, with one game from each round being shown on Twitch.

== Teams ==
- Bradford Bulls
- Castleford Tigers
- Featherstone Rovers
- Huddersfield Giants
- Leeds Rhinos
- St Helens
- Wakefield Trinity
- Warrington Wolves
- Wigan Warriors
- York City Knights

== Results ==
Leeds Rhinos ended the regular season unbeaten to top the table and were joined in the play-offs by St Helens, Wigan Warriors, Castleford Tigers and York City Knights.

In the play-offs it was St Helens who went unbeaten to win the League Leaders Shield and home advantage in the semi-finals. Leeds finished second to take the other home advantage spot having forfeited the match against St Helens. Both teams won their semi-finals to set up a Grand final meeting on 10 October. St Helens won the final 28–0 o lift the trophy for the first time.

The Shield competition it was Featherstone Rovers who managed to go unbeaten winning all four games to secure home advantage in the semi-finals, Huddersfield Giants finished second. Featherstone beat Bradford Bulls to go through to the Shield final with Huddersfield beating Warrington after three 5-minute periods of golden point extra time to qualify for the final. Huddersfield took the Shield beating Featherstone 24–22.

=== Forfeited games ===
Like all matches conducted under RFL governance, matches can be forfeited if clubs are unable for fulfil fixtures. Under the RFL operational rules, forfeited matches are treated as a 24–0 victory for the non-forfeiting team. For 2021 the RFL's COVID-19 protocols apply to the league. If a club has seven or more players stood down due to either; positive tests or self-isolating, due to close contact, then the club can request a postponement of a match. No matches were affected by COVID until round 5, when the match between St Helens and Wigan was postponed, due to St Helens having more than seven players unavailable due to self-isolation.

In round 6, St Helens had some players available after self-isolation, but due to injuries, they could not get a squad together to play York, and as the number of players missing due to COVID was less than seven, St Helens had to forfeit the fixture. York were awarded a second fixture when their round 7 opponents Bradford forfeited the match, due to injuries and unavailability of players.

Wakefield were forced to forfeit their round 9 match against St Helens after informing the RFL that due to COVID-19 and selection issues they would be unable to raise a team.

During the play-offs Leeds forfeited the game against St Helens after being unable to raise a team.

== Tables ==
=== Regular season table ===
| Pos | Team | Pld | W | D | L | PF | PA | PP | Pts | PCT | Qualification |
|---|---|---|---|---|---|---|---|---|---|---|---|
| 1 | Leeds Rhinos | 7 | 7 | 0 | 0 | 364 | 38 | 957.9 | 14 | 100.00 | Play-offs |
| 2 | St Helens | 7 | 6 | 0 | 1 | 370 | 36 | 1,027.8 | 12 | 85.71 | Play-offs |
| 3 | Wigan Warriors | 7 | 5 | 0 | 2 | 226 | 76 | 297.4 | 10 | 71.43 | Play-offs |
| 4 | York City Knights | 7 | 5 | 0 | 2 | 198 | 106 | 186.8 | 10 | 71.43 | Play-offs |
| 5 | Castleford Tigers | 6 | 4 | 0 | 2 | 166 | 96 | 172.9 | 8 | 66.67 | Play-offs |
| 6 | Featherstone Rovers | 8 | 3 | 0 | 5 | 154 | 308 | 50.0 | 6 | 37.50 | Shield |
| 7 | Huddersfield Giants | 7 | 2 | 0 | 5 | 104 | 288 | 36.1 | 4 | 28.57 | Shield |
| 8 | Warrington Wolves | 8 | 2 | 0 | 6 | 150 | 334 | 44.9 | 4 | 25.00 | Shield |
| 9 | Bradford Bulls | 8 | 2 | 0 | 6 | 128 | 294 | 43.5 | 4 | 25.00 | Shield |
| 10 | Wakefield Trinity | 7 | 0 | 0 | 7 | 50 | 334 | 15.0 | 0 | 0.00 | Shield |

=== Play-off table ===
| Pos | Team | Pld | W | D | L | PF | PA | PP | Pts | PCT | |
|---|---|---|---|---|---|---|---|---|---|---|---|
| 1 | St Helens | 4 | 4 | 0 | 0 | 158 | 6 | 2,633.3 | 8 | 100.00 | League Leaders' Shield & play-off semi-final |
| 2 | Leeds Rhinos | 4 | 3 | 0 | 1 | 70 | 44 | 159.1 | 6 | 75.00 | Play-off semi-final |
| 3 | York City Knights | 4 | 2 | 0 | 2 | 52 | 66 | 78.8 | 4 | 50.00 | Play-off semi-final |
| 4 | Castleford Tigers | 4 | 1 | 0 | 3 | 36 | 112 | 32.1 | 2 | 25.00 | Play-off semi-final |
| 5 | Wigan Warriors | 4 | 0 | 0 | 4 | 22 | 110 | 20.0 | 0 | 0.00 | |

=== Shield table ===
| Pos | Team | Pld | W | D | L | PF | PA | PP | Pts | PCT | Qualification |
|---|---|---|---|---|---|---|---|---|---|---|---|
| 1 | Featherstone Rovers | 4 | 4 | 0 | 0 | 130 | 36 | 361.1 | 8 | 100.00 | Semi-finals |
| 2 | Huddersfield Giants | 4 | 3 | 0 | 1 | 152 | 52 | 292.3 | 6 | 75.00 | Semi-finals |
| 3 | Warrington Wolves | 4 | 2 | 0 | 2 | 144 | 68 | 211.8 | 4 | 50.00 | Semi-finals |
| 4 | Bradford Bulls | 4 | 1 | 0 | 3 | 66 | 90 | 73.3 | 2 | 25.00 | Semi-finals |
| 5 | Wakefield Trinity | 4 | 0 | 0 | 4 | 6 | 252 | 2.4 | 0 | 0.00 | |

== End of season awards ==
Jodie Cunningham (St Helens) was named as the Woman of Steel at the end of season awards.
