= 2020 RFL Women's Super League =

Cancelled women's rugby league competition in Great Britain

2020 Women's Super League
- Teams: 10

The 2020 RFL Women's Super League, known as the Betfred Women's Super League for sponsorship reasons, was the fourth season of the Rugby League Women's Super League for female players in clubs affiliated to the Rugby Football League (RFL). The competition was cancelled in August 2020 due to the COVID-19 pandemic

The defending champions were Leeds Rhinos who beat Castleford Tigers 20–12 in the 2019 Grand Final on 11 October 2019.

For 2020, the number of teams had been expanded from eight to ten, with the addition of Huddersfield Giants and Warrington Wolves to the league.

The format of the league had changed from 2019. The first nine rounds would have seen each team play each other once. After nine rounds the top four teams would have split off to play six further rounds (the play-offs) where each team would have played the others both home and away. After those play-offs the top two teams would have competed in the Grand Final. The bottom six teams after nine rounds were to compete for the Super League Shield. Each would have played each of the other teams once with the top four after these six rounds meeting in the Shield semi-finals. The winners of the semi-finals meeting in the Shield final. In both the play-offs and the shield, points earned in the first nine games were to be carried forward to the later part of the season.

The Grand Final and the Shield final was to have been played as a double-header at Emerald Headingley, Leeds on 11 October 2020.

The season was suspended in March 2020 before any matches had been played as part of the United Kingdom's response to the COVID-19 pandemic. On 27 August 2020 the RFL announced that the season had been cancelled.

== Teams ==
Club	Location
Bradford Bulls	Bradford, West Yorkshire
Castleford Tigers	Castleford, West Yorkshire
Featherstone Rovers	Featherstone, West Yorkshire
Huddersfield Giants	Huddersfield, West Yorkshire
Leeds Rhinos	Leeds, West Yorkshire
St Helens	St Helens, Merseyside
Wakefield Trinity	Wakefield, West Yorkshire
Warrington Wolves	Warrington, Cheshire
Wigan Warriors	Wigan, Greater Manchester
York City Knights	York, North Yorkshire
