= 2022 RFL Women's Super League =

Women's rugby league competition in Great Britain

2022 Women's Super League
- Teams: 12
- Matches played: 92
- Points scored: 2,241
- Champions: Leeds Rhinos
- League Leaders Shield: York City Knights
- Runners-up: York City Knights
- Biggest home win: Warrington Wolves 86–0 Wakefield Trinity (22 May 2022)
- Biggest away win: Wakefield Trinity 0–102 Warrington Wolves (31 July 2022)
- Woman of Steel: Tara-Jane Stanley; (York City Knights)

Promotion and relegation
- Promoted from Group 2: Warrington Wolves

The 2022 RFL Women's Super League (also known as the Betfred Women's Super League for sponsorship reasons) was the sixth season of the Rugby League Women's Super League, for female players in clubs affiliated to the Rugby Football League (RFL).

The title was won by Leeds Rhinos who beat York City Knights 12–4 in the grand final. York had finished top of the table to win the league leader's shield.

The defending champions were St Helens, who beat Leeds Rhinos 28–0 in the Grand Final at Headingley on 10 October 2021, in front of a record crowd of 4,235.

The league increased the number of participating teams by 2, from 10 to 12, with Barrow Raiders and Leigh Miners Rangers being promoted to the Super League, after finishing first and second respectively in the 2021 Women's Championship. However, the structure of the league has changed, with the league being split into two groups; a structure based on the play-off and shield structures used in the second half of the 2021 season. Group 1 comprises Huddersfield, Leeds, St Helens, Wigan and York. Group 2 comprises Barrow, Bradford, Castleford, Leigh Miners, Featherstone, Wakefield and Warrington. The RFL explained that the split structure as giving the player for clubs in group 1, challenging fixtures in the run-up to the World Cup; while allowing the clubs in group 2, the opportunity to develop by playing clubs in more competitive matches. However, in April 2022, the RFL acceded to a request from Castleford, for the club to be placed in Group 2, thus changing the structure, with Group 1 containing five clubs and group 2 seven clubs.

== Teams ==
=== Group 1 ===
- Huddersfield Giants
- Leeds Rhinos
- St Helens
- Wigan Warriors
- York City Knights

=== Group 2 ===
- Barrow Raiders
- Bradford Bulls
- Castleford Tigers
- Featherstone Rovers
- Leigh Miners Rangers
- Wakefield Trinity
- Warrington Wolves

== Regular season tables ==
=== Group 1 ===
Pos	Team	Pld	W	D	L	PF	PA	PD	Pts	Qualification
1	York City Knights	8	7	0	1	242	58	+184	14	League Leaders Shield & Advance to semi-finals
2	St Helens	8	6	0	2	314	63	+251	12	Advance to semi-finals
3	Leeds Rhinos	8	5	0	3	320	116	+204	10	Advance to semi-finals
4	Wigan Warriors	8	2	0	6	104	313	−209	4	Advance to semi-finals
5	Huddersfield Giants	8	0	0	8	32	462	−430	0	

=== Group 2 ===
Pos	Team	Pld	W	D	L	PF	PA	PD	Pts	Qualification
1	Warrington Wolves	12	12	0	0	744	36	+708	24	Advance to semi-finals
2	Barrow Raiders	12	9	0	3	386	168	+218	18	Advance to semi-finals
3	Featherstone Rovers	12	8	0	4	370	156	+214	16	Advance to semi-finals
4	Bradford Bulls	12	6	0	6	202	296	−94	12	Advance to semi-finals
5	Leigh Miners Rangers	12	4	0	8	174	298	−124	8	
6	Castleford Tigers	12	2	0	10	106	510	−404	4	
7	Wakefield Trinity	12	1	0	11	68	586	−518	2	

== Play-offs ==
The play-off structure for each group was the same; 1st v 4th and 2nd v 3rd in the semi-finals with the winners meeting in the final. In Group 1, the final known as the Grand Final would determine the champions for the season. In Group 2 the final was called the Shield Final and would determine which team was promoted to Group 1 for 2023. The finals were played as a double header at the Totally Wicked Stadium in St Helens.

=== Group 1 ===
In the semi-finals York beat Wigan 12–4 and Leeds beat St Helens 14–6. Leeds beat York 12–4 in the Grand Final to take their second title.

=== Group 2 ===
Warrington beat Bradford 72–0 while Featherstone beat Barrow 12–10 in the semi-finals. In the Shield Final, Warrington won 34–6 against Featherstone to be promoted to Group A.

== End of season awards ==
At the end of season awards on 24 September, three awards were made:

- Woman of Steel: Tara-Jane Stanley (York City Knights)
- Coach Of The Year: Lois Forsell (Leeds Rhinos)
- Young player of the year: Hollie-Mae Dodd (York City Knights)
