= Richard Pell =

English rugby league footballer and coach

Personal information
- Full name: Richard John Pell
- Born: 17 October 1966 (age 59) Pontefract district, England

Playing information
- Position: Prop
Club
Years	Team	Pld	T	G	FG	P
1985–85	Wakefield Trinity	1	0	0	0	0
1991–94	Doncaster	46	2	5	0	18
1994–96	Hunslet	51	6	74	0	172
1997	Doncaster	17	2	1	0	10
	Total	115	10	80	0	200

Coaching information
Club
Years	Team	Gms	W	D	L	W%
2010–11	Gateshead Thunder	1	0	0	1	0

Richard Pell (born 17 October 1966) is an English former professional rugby league footballer who played in the 1980s and 1990s, and coached in the 2000s and 2010s. He played at club level for Wakefield Trinity, Doncaster (two spells), and Hunslet, as a prop.

After his playing career, he coached at several different teams, most notably as head coach of Gateshead Thunder between 2010 and 2011. Since 2013, he is the General Manager at Castleford Tigers.

== Background ==
Pell's birth was registered in Pontefract district, West Riding of Yorkshire, England. He played junior rugby league for Cutsyke ARLFC.

== Playing career ==
Pell made his début for Wakefield Trinity during April 1985.

== Post-playing ==
After retiring as a player, Pell coached at amateur level for several years, coaching at Cutsyke and Hunslet Warriors before taking over at Castleford Lock Lane in 2003. In 2008, he was appointed by Castleford Tigers as a reserve team coach, initially as an assistant under Chris Chester, before taking charge of the team following Chester's departure.

In July 2010, he was appointed as head coach of Gateshead Thunder. He left the club in May 2011.

He was also the Head of Talent Identification at Huddersfield Giants, Director of Rugby at Castleford RUFC, and since 2013 is the General Manager at Castleford Tigers.
