= RFL Women's Super League =

Professional women's rugby league

Women's Super League
- Current season, competition or edition: 2026 RFL Women's Super League
- Sport: Rugby league
- Founded: 2017; 9 years ago
- No. of teams: 8
- Country: England
- Most recent champions: York Valkyrie (3rd title)
- Most titles: York Valkyrie; (3 titles)
- Broadcaster: Sky Sports
- Level on pyramid: 1
- Relegation to: RFL Women's Championship
- Domestic cup: Women's Challenge Cup
- Website: Women's Super League

The Rugby Football League Women's Super League (known as the Betfred Women's Super League due to sponsorship) is the elite women's rugby league club competition in England.

== History ==
=== Before 2017: Background ===
The first female rugby league teams in England were formed in the 1980s. The Women's Amateur Rugby League Association (WARLA) was established in the mid-1980s and a league that initially had six teams expanded to 18 teams across two divisions by 1991. In 2008, the Women's Rugby League Conference was inaugurated and this was followed by the RFL Women's Rugby League, set up in 2014. It was mostly made up of community clubs with only Hunslet, Featherstone Rovers and Rochdale Hornets being professional clubs with a women's team. The Bradford Thunderbirds team became Bradford Bulls in 2016. The league had a very low profile and only ran for three years until the Women's Super League was formed in 2017.

=== 2017–2023: Foundations and expansion ===
To give the sport a bigger profile, the Super League name used by the men's game was adopted in 2017. The new league was still made up of community clubs but more professional clubs entered a women's team, The four founding clubs were Bradford Bulls, Castleford Tigers, Featherstone Rovers and Thatto Heath Crusaders. In the inaugural season Bradford Bulls finished top of the league before defeating Featherstone by 36–6 in the Grand Final to add to their success of having also won the Challenge Cup earlier in the year. The league expanded in 2018 with Leeds Rhinos, York City Knights and Wigan Warriors joining while St Helens took over from Thatto Heath Crusaders. Leeds took the League Leaders' Shield but were defeated 18–16 by Wigan in the Grand Final. The league was expanded again to eight clubs for 2019 with the addition of Wakefield Trinity. Leeds defeated League Leaders' Castleford by 20–12 to become champions in front of a record crowd for a Women's Grand Final of 1,673.

In 2020, the growth of the league was planned to continue with Warrington Wolves and Huddersfield Giants joining from the Championship. The structure was also slightly changed with the addition of a mid-season split and Shield Final for the bottom five clubs to play for. However, with competition suspended in 2020 the changes did not come in until the 2021 season. A Grand Final record crowd of 4,235 saw St Helens complete the treble with a 28–0 win over Leeds and Huddersfield won the Shield Final. 2022 saw the introduction of the RFL Women's Nines as a pre-season tournament for 20 teams which included all the sides in the Super League. In 2022, the league expanded to 12 teams with the addition of Leigh Miners Rangers and Barrow Raiders who had been the top two teams in the 2021 Championship. It was also split into two groups with end of season promotion and relegation between them. League Leaders' York lost 12–4 to Leeds in the Grand Final and Warrington won the Shield Final to earn promotion to Group 1. However, as Castleford had opted to play in Group 2 in 2022 there was no relegation this season.

In the 2023 season Wakefield dropped down to the Championship and were replaced by the Salford Red Devils and Leigh Leopards took the place of Leigh Miners Rangers following a partnership agreement between the two teams. York Valkyrie (the renamed York City Knights) retained the League Leaders' Shield and defeated Leeds 16–6 to become champions in front of a new Grand Final record crowd of 4,547. Barrow won the Group 2 Final to secure their place in the 2024 Super League alongside Featherstone who finished top in Group 2.

=== 2024: Establishment of a national pyramid ===
In January 2023, the Rugby Football League announced a new pyramid structure for women's rugby league based on a long term vision outlined in 2016 in which the Super League would sit above four regional divisions, Midlands, North, Roses and South, who would compete for promotion to the Super League. The WSL South had been established in 2021 and the Midlands and North leagues were launched in 2023. The change meant that the Super League would be reduced to eight teams from 2024, with four of the teams from Group 2 in 2023 joined by clubs from the Championship as part of a new tier two league. On 24 January, when the fixtures for the 2024 Super League season were announced, it was revealed that in 2024 the second tier would have only three leagues: Midlands, Northern and Southern, from which only the winners of the Northern and Southern Championships would meet in the National Championship Final for the chance to face the bottom side of the Super League in play-off for a chance to earn promotion. In October 2024, Featherstone Rovers were relegated following a 34–16 defeat to Championship winners Leigh Leopards, and York Valkyrie became the first side to retain the Super League title by defeating St Helens 18–8 in the Grand Final. In the 2025 season, Warrington Wolves withdrew from the competition in early September meaning that they were relegated without contesting a play-off against Featherstone Rovers. In October, Wigan defeated St Helens 16–12 in the Grand Final to complete a treble having beaten the same opponents in the Challenge Cup final earlier in the season.

== Clubs ==
=== Current clubs ===
Clubs in the Super League
Super League clubs
Club	Location	Stadia
Barrow Raiders	Barrow-in-Furness, Cumbria	Craven Park
Featherstone Rovers	Featherstone, West Yorkshire	Post Office Road
Huddersfield Giants	Huddersfield, West Yorkshire	Laund Hill, Accu Stadium
Leeds Rhinos	Leeds, West Yorkshire	Headingley Stadium
Leigh Leopards	Leigh, Greater Manchester	Leigh Sports Village, Twist Lane
St Helens	St Helens, Merseyside	BrewDog Stadium
Wigan Warriors	Wigan, Greater Manchester	Brick Community Stadium, Robin Park Arena
York Valkyrie	York, North Yorkshire	York Community Stadium

=== Clubs by season ===
Table of club participation in Super League by season
Super League clubs by season
Club	2017	2018	2019	2020 (Note: No competition held in 2020)	2021	2022	2023	2024	2025	2026
Barrow Raiders						X	X	X	X	X
Bradford Bulls	T	X	X	—N/a	X	X	X			
Castleford Tigers	X	X	L	—N/a	X	X	X			
Featherstone Rovers	X	X	X	—N/a	X	X	X	X	X	X
Huddersfield Giants				—N/a	X	X	X	X	X	X
Leeds Rhinos		L	D	—N/a	X	G	X	X	X	X
Leigh Leopards (Note: As Leigh Miners Rangers in 2022)						X	X		X	X
Salford Red Devils							X			
St Helens (Note: As Thatto Heath in 2017)	X	X	X	—N/a	T	X	X	L	X	X
Wakefield Trinity			X	—N/a	X	X				
Warrington Wolves				—N/a	X	X	X	X	X	
Wigan Warriors		G	X	—N/a	X	X	X	X	T	L
York Valkyrie (Note: As York City Knights from 2018 to 2022)		X	X	—N/a	X	L	W	G	X	G

Source: Match Centre

Legend

- X = Participated in season
- L = League Leaders
- G = Grand Final winners
- W = Won both League Leaders' Shield and Grand Final
- D = Double winners (Grand Final and Challenge Cup)
- T = Treble winners (League, Grand Final and Challenge Cup)

== Season structure ==
=== Historical ===
Between 2017 and 2019 the league was played with each team playing all the others home and away. With only four teams competing in 2017, the top team at the end of the regular season qualified for the Grand Final against the winner of a play-off between the second and third-placed teams. In 2018 and 2019, the top four teams played two semi-finals and the winners met in the Grand Final. n For 2021 a new structure was introduced. At the start of the season it was planned that the ten teams would play each other once, home or away over nine rounds. After this the top four would play-off for a place in the Grand Final and the remaining six teams would compete for the Shield. However, In July a change to the format was announced in which the league was split in half. The top five went into a play-off section where each team played the others once more. The team finishing top of this play-off section won the League Leaders' Shield. The top four in the play-offs then met in two semi-finals and the winners of these two games competed in the Grand Final. The bottom five teams in the regular season entered the Shield competition which followed an identical format to the play-offs, where the winners of the two semi-finals met in the Shield final.

2022 saw further changes with the Super League expanded to 12 teams and split from the outset into two sections; Group 1 and Group 2. This decision was made to introduce more competitive fixtures as the 2021 season drew criticism for the number of very one-sided matches. The same format was retained for 2023. In early 2023, it was announced that from 2024 the league would be reduced to eight clubs as part of a new integrated structure for the women's game in the United Kingdom. At the end of the season, the bottom side in the competition will face the tier-two champion (in 2024 this was the winner of play-offs between the northern and southern regional divisions) for a place in the Super League the following season. In previous years admission to the Super League had been by invitation only.

=== 2026 format ===
In January 2026, the RFL reintroduced a mid-season split to the Women's Super League with teams playing the each other once, home or away, followed by an extended play-off series where teams play home and away fixtures against the other teams in their half of the table. The team at the top of the table is then awarded the League Leader's Shield and qualify for the Grand Final where they are joined by the winner of a play-off semi-final between the teams finishing second and third.

=== Final venues ===
Five venues have so far hosted the Grand Final. In 2017 and 2018 the Grand Final and the Championship Final were played at the Manchester Regional Arena before the men's Grand Final at Old Trafford. The 2019 final was played at the Totally Wicked Stadium on a Friday night. It was originally planned to take place at Headingley, but was rescheduled due to the Rugby League World Cup 9s. Headingley was also the intended venue for the 2020 Grand Final. It eventually hosted the event in 2021 when the Grand Final and the Shield final were played as double-headers, as they also were in 2022 at the Totally Wicked Stadium. In 2023, the Grand Final was played at York Community Stadium along with the Group 2 promotion final.

City	Stadium	Years
Manchester	Manchester Regional Arena	2017–2018
St Helens	Totally Wicked Stadium	2019, 2022, 2024
Leeds	Headingley	2020–2021
York	York Community Stadium	2023
Wigan	Brick Community Stadium	2025–2026

== Results ==
List of grand final winners, runners-up and league leaders by season
Season	Champions	Score	Runners-up	League Leaders
2017	Bradford Bulls	36–6	Featherstone Rovers	Bradford Bulls
2018	Wigan Warriors	18–16	Leeds Rhinos	Leeds Rhinos
2019	Leeds Rhinos	20–12	Castleford Tigers	Castleford Tigers
2020	Cancelled due to the COVID-19 pandemic			
2021	St Helens	28–0	Leeds Rhinos	St Helens
2022	Leeds Rhinos	12–4	York City Knights	York City Knights
2023	York Valkyrie	16–6	Leeds Rhinos	York Valkyrie
2024	York Valkyrie	18–8	St Helens	St Helens
2025	Wigan Warriors	16–12	St Helens	Wigan Warriors
2026	York Valkyrie	8–6	Wigan Warriors	Wigan Warriors

=== Champions ===
List of teams by number of Grand Final wins
	Club	Wins	Runners up	Winning years
1	York Valkyrie	3	1	2023, 2024, 2026
2	Leeds Rhinos	2	3	2019, 2022
3	Wigan Warriors	2	1	2018, 2025
4	St Helens	1	2	2021
5	Bradford Bulls	1	0	2017
6	Featherstone Rovers	0	1	
6	Castleford Tigers	0	1	

=== League Leaders' Shield ===
The League Leaders' Shield is awarded to the team finishing the regular season top of Super League.

List of teams by number of League Leaders' Shield wins
	Club	Wins	Winning years
1	York Valkyrie	2	2022, 2023
1	St Helens	2	2021, 2024
1	Wigan Warriors	2	2025, 2026
2	Bradford Bulls	1	2017
2	Leeds Rhinos	1	2018
2	Castleford Tigers	1	2019

=== The Double ===
In rugby league, the term 'the Double' is referring to the achievement of a club that wins the top division and Challenge Cup in the same season. Since the establishment of the Super League it has been achieved by the following teams:

	Club	Wins	Winning years
1	Bradford Bulls	1	2017
1	Leeds Rhinos	1	2019
1	St Helens	1	2021
1	Wigan Warriors	1	2025

=== The Treble ===
The Treble refers to the team who wins all three domestic honours on offer during the season; Grand Final, League Leaders' Shield and Challenge Cup. In 2012, Featherstone Rovers won the first Challenge Cup, finished top of the Women's Rugby League Premier Division and won the Championship final. In 2013, Thatto Heath Crusaders matched the achievements of Featherstone to claim their first treble. When Thatto Heath won the treble again in 2016 they also defeated French champions Biganos to claim the European Challenge title. Since the establishment of the Super League the treble has been achieved by the following teams:

	Club	Wins	Winning years
1	Bradford Bulls	1	2017
1	St Helens	1	2021
1	Wigan Warriors	1	2025

== Awards ==
The Woman of Steel is an annual award for the best player of the season in Super League. It was formed in 2018 to become a part of the Man of Steel Awards at the end of the men's Super League season. Awards are also given for the Young Player of the Year and the Coach of the Year.

== Sponsorship ==
In August 2019, a sponsorship deal with bookmakers Betfred was announced to start immediately and run until the end of the 2021 season (concurrent with Betfred's sponsorship of Super League). In October 2021, it was announced that the sponsorship deal had been was extended for a further two years. A three-year extension to the sponsorship was announced in October 2023 as part of a deal that included men's, women's and wheelchair cup and league competitions.

== See also ==
- NRL Women's Premiership
