= Huddersfield Giants Women =

English women's rugby league club

Huddersfield Giants
Club information
- Full name: Huddersfield Giants Rugby League Football Club
- Nickname: Giantesses
- Colours: Claret and Gold
- Founded: 2017; 9 years ago
- Website: Huddersfield Giants

Current details
- Grounds: Laund Hill, Huddersfield; Kirklees Stadium
- Coach: Nathan Graham
- Captain: Bethan Oates
- Competition: RFL Women's Super League
- 2026: 1st in Shield (5th overall)
- Current season

Records
- Super League Shield: 1 (202)

Huddersfield Giants Women are the women's rugby league team of Huddersfield Giants from Huddersfield, West Yorkshire, England. They compete in the RFL Women's Super League, playing their home games at Laund Hill and double header matches with the men's team at the Kirklees Stadium.

== History ==
In December 2017, plans were announced for a Huddersfield Giants girls' under-19s team with the aim of developing a team to compete in the 2018 Super League. Team trials took place in January 2018. In February, the team announced their first squad which consisted of dual-registered players from community clubs, with more than half from either Illingworth Girls or Huddersfield St Josephs, and included future England international Olivia Wood. Grace Ramsden was announced as captain in April. Using Laund Hill, the Huddersfield YMCA sports complex, as their home ground Huddersfield Giants played their first game on 17 June 2018, winning 58–16 against the Royal Navy. This was followed by matches against the under-19's teams of clubs including Wigan Warriors, Leeds Rhinos and Castleford Tigers.

Huddersfield had planned to join the Super League in 2019 but part way through the 2018 season a change was made to the eligibility criteria so that it required teams to have completed a season in the Championship. For the 2019 season Huddersfield continued with the under-19s team and established an open age team which competed in the Championship. The Giants also expanded their squad by signing former Great Britain internationals Jordanna Proctor and Shelley Brook for the 2019 season. Huddersfield took part in their first Challenge Cup but lost 34–12 to the Army in the first round. In the league they lost 36–4 to Warrington Wolves in the semi-final of the play-offs, but they had achieved the objective with a top-four finish which saw them, and Warrington, accepted into the Super League for the following season. However, they were both made to wait due to the cancellation of the 2020 season.

In April 2021, before Huddersfield had begun their Super League campaign, the two new teams faced each other in the Challenge Cup where a 38–12 loss meant Huddersfield failed to qualify for the quarter-finals. It was not until 2 May 2021 that Huddersfield made their debut in the Super League with a 90–0 loss to St Helens. Their first win came two weeks later with a score of 28–20 against Bradford Bulls. After finishing in 7th place in the regular season they took part in the Shield competition. They qualified for the play-offs where they won their semi-final match 30–26 against Warrington with a golden point try scored by Erin Stott in the third period of extra-time. In October 2021, the team earned their first trophy with a 24–22 win over Featherstone Rovers in the Shield Final.

The Super League was split into two groups in 2022 with Huddersfield placed in Group 1 due to having won the Shield Final. They missed out on the play-offs having failed to win any of their league games. In the Challenge Cup Huddersfield progressed from the group stage with a 114–0 win over Hull FC, including 7 tries from Amelia Brown, before losing to St Helens in the quarter-final. Huddersfield reached the quarter-final of the Cup again in 2023, and despite finishing bottom of their group for a second season they retained their top-tier league status for 2024 due to the restructuring of the national pyramid. In October 2023, plans were announced for the creation of several full-time roles dedicated to managing the women's team and the introduction of financial rewards and contracts for the players. These changes included transferring the running of the team from Huddersfield Giants Community Trust (the club's charitable organisation) to the main Huddersfield Giants club. This saw the Giants equipped with full time medical professionals and access to the club's training facilities. On 6 November, Bethan Oates and Amelia Brown became the first players to sign professional contracts with the club.

In the 2024 season, Huddersfield reached the quarter-finals of the Challenge Cup again before being knocked out by defending champions St Helens. In the Nines tournament they were awarded a wildcard place to the final's day and went on to reach the semi-finals. In the Super League, a 36–0 win over Warrington on the final day of the regular season ensured a sixth-place finish in the table. The 2025 season saw Huddersfield make a fourth consecutive quarter-finals appearance in the Challenge Cup and at the Nines tournament the team reached the final of the main competition. In the Super League, Huddersfield finished off the regular season with a win over Barrow to confirm fifth-place in the table. In the 2026 season, a 24–22 win over Catalans Dragons in the group stage of the Challenge Cup earned Huddersfield a place in the quarter-finals where they lost to York Valkyrie. In the Super League, Huddersfield were in fifth place at the mid-season split and went on to finish first in the Shield Competition. Huddersfield's Amelia Brown was the top try scorer for the Super League season with 26 tries.

== Grounds ==
=== Laund Hill ===
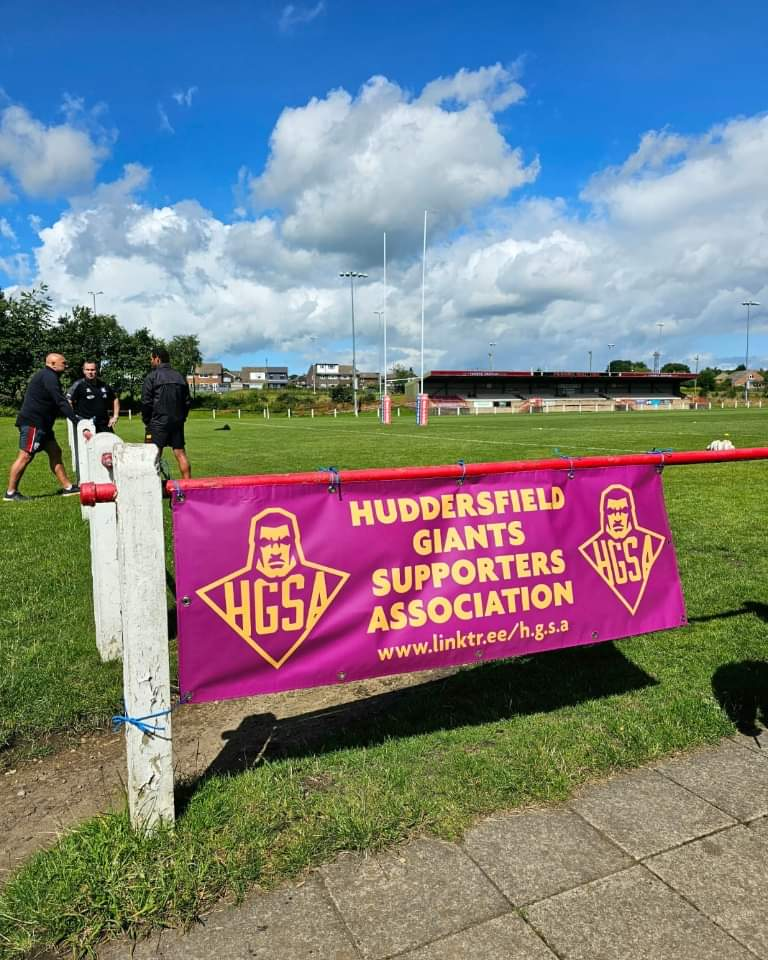
HGSA banner at Laund Hill

Laund Hill is the main home venue for the Huddersfield Giants women's team. It was previously known as the Orchard FM Community Sports Park, or Orchard Park, and plans were being discussed by Huddersfield YMCA for a £700,000 redevelopment of the 16-acre (6.5 ha) site. However, The YMCA went into administration in September 2019 and the site was bought in 2021 by the owner of Huddersfield Giants, Ken Davy, who stated plans for the installation of an all-weather 3G or 4G pitch at the complex which was planned to be the training base for club and was opened in 2023.

=== John Smith's Stadium ===
The John Smith's Stadium is home to Huddersfield Town football club and the Huddersfield Giants men's team. The Giants women's team have played there as part of double header fixtures with the men's team.

== Supporters ==
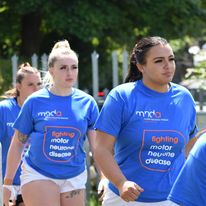
Huddersfield Giants Women help to raise awareness for MNDA

As with the Giants' men's junior teams, the women's games are organised and supported by the Huddersfield Giants Supporters Association (HGSA) who provide volunteer teams to promote, run and support the teams. They have also arranged fundraising events such as raising funds and awareness for MNDA at a game v Leeds following the death of Rob Burrow.

== Seasons ==
Season	League									Play-offs	Challenge Cup	Ref.
Season	Division	P	W	D	L	F	A	Pts	Pos	Play-offs	Challenge Cup	Ref.
2019	Championship	14	6	0	8	220	292	12	4th	Lost in Semi-final	R1	
2020	Super League	Cancelled due to the COVID-19 pandemic										
2021	Super League	7	2	0	5	104	288	4	7th	Did not qualify	R1	
2021	Super League Shield	4	3	0	1	152	52	6	2nd	Won in Shield Final	R1	
2022	Super League	8	0	0	8	32	462	0	5th	Did not qualify	QF	
2023	Super League	10	1	0	9	102	452	2	6th	Did not qualify	QF	
2024	Super League	14	4	0	10	204	556	8	6th	Did not qualify	QF	
2025	Super League	14	5	1	8	268	428	11	5th	Did not qualify	QF	
2026	Super League	7	3	0	4	136	92	8	5th	—N/a	QF	
2026	Shield (Note: standings carried over from regular season)	13	8	0	5	376	254	16	1st	Did not qualify	QF	

== Honours ==
- RFL Women's Super League Shield:
  - Winners: 2021
