= Castleford Tigers Women =

English female rugby league club

Club information
- Full name: Castleford Tigers Rugby League Football Club
- Nickname: "Tigresses"
- Short name: Castleford Tigers
- Colours: Black and Amber
- Founded: 2016; 10 years ago
- Website: castlefordtigers.com

Current details
- Chairman: Ian Fulton
- Coach: Rob Richardson
- Captain: Kaitlin Varley
- Competition: National Championship
- 2026 season: 10th

Records
- League Leaders' Shield: 1 (2019)

The Castleford Tigers Women are a female rugby league club in Castleford, West Yorkshire, England. Nicknamed the Tigresses, the club formed in 2016 and in 2017 were one of the four teams that participated in the inaugural season of the Women's Super League, the top-level Women's rugby league club competition in the United Kingdom. As of 2026 they compete in the National Championship.

== History ==
=== Formation ===
The Women's Team was formed in 2016 following discussions between local teachers Jonny Payne and Danny Holmes, who had set up girls teams for local amateur club Cutsyke Raiders, and Castleford Tigers Board Members Steve Gill and Richard Pell.

=== Debut season ===
In April 2017, Castleford made their debut in the Challenge Cup with a 48–6 first-round win over Wakefield Trinity, but were knocked out by Bradford Bulls in the quarter-finals. In the inaugural season of the Women's Super League Castleford Tigers competed as one of 4 teams in the competition alongside Thatto Heath Crusaders and Yorkshire rivals Bradford Bulls and Featherstone Rovers. The Tigers finished bottom of the league winning only one of their six games, a 48–18 win in the opening round against Featherstone.

=== 2018 season ===
With a larger number of teams joining the competition, 2018 saw Castleford compete as one of 7 teams in the Women's Super League, alongside Bradford, Featherstone, St Helens (who replaced Thatto Heath) and newcomers York City Knights, Wigan Warriors and Leeds Rhinos. Widnes Vikings had harboured hopes of joining the competition but pulled out before the season started.

Castleford kicked off the season with a 62-0 win over York and went on to win 4 of their 7 games, along with 2 draws and 1 loss. On 4 August, they played Leeds Rhinos in the final of the 2018 Women's Challenge Cup at the Halliwell Jones Stadium, Warrington. Castleford led 14-6 at half-time but eventually succumbed to 20-14 defeat, finishing as runners-up.

=== 2019 season ===
The Tigresses kicked off the 2019 season with a 78-0 win against York City Knights before going on to win their first seven Super League games remaining as the only unbeaten side in the competition to date. In the 2019 Women's Challenge Cup, the side beat local rivals Featherstone Rovers, Bradford Bulls and also a 100-0 victory of local rivals Wakefield Trinity, a record in Women's rugby league, en route to a second successive Challenge Cup Final. The final was played at the University of Bolton Stadium on 27 July, as part of a triple-header of games with the men's Challenge Cup Semi-finals. The Tigresses also broke the record attendance for a Women's game with a crowd of 1,492 at their quarter-final tie against Bradford

=== 2020 season ===
The Tigresses were ready to kick off the 2020 season with the intentions of putting the losses of the finals in 2019 behind them, but due to Covid 19 the season never got started as the year went on the announcement of Claire Garner retiring from the sport, The England international will be miss by al at the Tigers, Meg Birch also has stepped away from rugby after the birth of her second child.

=== 2024 season ===
In 2024, Castleford were scheduled to take part in the Challenge Cup but they withdrew before the start of the competition. Following the restructuring of the women's league pyramid it was announced that Castleford would be in the 2024 Northern Women's Championship.

== Stadium ==
=== The Jungle ===
Castleford Tigers Women currently play their home games at Wheldon Road, home of Castleford Tigers

== Playing Squad 2023 ==
2023 Castleford Tigers Women
First team squad			Coaching staff
1 Emmi McFarlane; 2 Allana Waller; 3 Kaitlin Varley (c); 4 Caitlin Johnson; 5 Lauren Waller; 6 Abby Cromack; 7 Alisha Nix; 8 Ruby Parker; 9 Liv Riding; 10 Steph Spence-Hirst; 11 Emily White; 12 Aimee-Leigh Wood; 13 Maisie Lumb	14 Maddison Rainey; 15 Bethannie Seisay-Reynolds; 16 Laura Stanworth; 17 Courtney Evans; 18 Ellie Brown; 19 Liv Atherton; 20 Tahnee Holmes; 21 Bryony Jackson; 22 Millie Morgan; 23 Martha Brown; 24 Lisa Box; 25 Em Johnstone; 26 Georgia Smith	27 Honor Ratcliffe; 28 Laura Carrington; 29 Emily Carlisle; 30 Sam Burnell; 31 Gabbi Ellis; 32 Abbie Fox; 33 Grace Ashurst-Bagshaw	Head coach: Rob Richardson; Legend: (c) Captain(s); (vc) Vice-captain(s); Updated: 14 April 2023; Source(s):

== Seasons ==
Season	League									Play-offs	Challenge Cup
Season	Division	P	W	D	L	F	A	Pts	Pos	Play-offs	Challenge Cup
2017	Super League	6	1	0	5	106	296	2	4th	Did not qualify	QF
2018	Super League	12	6	2	4	318	228	14	4th	Lost in semi-final	RU
2019	Super League	14	13	0	1	625	160	26	1st	Lost in Grand Final	RU
2020	Super League	Cancelled due to the COVID-19 pandemic									
2021	Super League	6	4	0	2	166	96	8	5th	Lost in preliminary final	SF
2022	Super League (G2)	12	2	0	10	106	510	4	6th	Did not qualify	GS
2023	Super League (G2)	10	0	0	10	44	410	0	6th	Did not qualify	GS
2024	Northern Championship	16	2	1	13	83	737	4	9th	Did not qualify	—N/a (Note: Withdrew before the start of the group stage)
2025	Northern Championship	10	0	0	10	88	404	0	11th	Did not qualify	—N/a
2026	National Championship	12	2	0	10	74	508	4	10th	Did not qualify	—N/a

== Honours ==
=== Leagues ===
- Women's Super League
  League Leaders' Shield (1): 2019

=== Cups ===
- HerRL Trophy
  Winners (1): 2019
- Yorkshire County Cup
  Winners (1): 2017
- London 9s
  Winners (1): 2018
