= York Valkyrie =

English women's rugby league team, based in York

York RLFC

Club information
- Full name: York Rugby League Football Club
- Nickname: Valkyrie
- Colours: Black and Amber
- Founded: 2016; 10 years ago
- Website: Official website

Current details
- Ground: York Community Stadium (8,500)
- Coach: Leon Pryce
- Competition: RFL Women's Super League
- 2026: 3rd (Champions)
- Current season

Records
- Women's Super League: 3 (2023, 2024, 2026)
- League Leaders' Shield: 2 (2022, 2023)

York Valkyrie are the women's rugby league team of York RLFC (known as York City Knights from 2002 to 2022) based in York, England. The Valkyrie, who were established in 2016 as York City Knights Ladies, compete in the Women's Super League and play their home games at York Community Stadium which is also home to York RLFC's men's team, York Knights, and football club, York City F.C..

== History ==
In May 2016 the York City Knights Ladies team was launched in partnership with the Knights Foundation. The team was formed to take part in the Women's Summer Merit League and although it included several players from the York Ladies team who had competed in the Women's Rugby League Association (winter season) League the head coach, Andy Fletcher, described it as "a brand new club and a brand new team". The previous club had been based at the New Earswick All Blacks ground and also used the facilities at York Acorn. The partnership meant that the team had use of the facilities at the Knights training base at York St John University's sports park.

In 2017 the team went undefeated in the Merit League and won the Challenge Shield.

They were accepted into the RFL Women's Super League in 2018 but had a poor start losing their first game 40–0 to St Helens. The team initially struggled in the Super League where their first win did not come until their tenth match when they defeated Featherstone Rovers 20–12. However, in the Challenge Cup they reached the semi-final for the first time. In 2019, York reached the final of the Challenge Shield, but York continued to struggle in the league where they won only one game.

In 2020, Katie Langan, who had been with the York Ladies and then City Knights teams since 2009, was appointed as captain. Following the Covid-enforced cancellation of the 2020 season, the team made several changes both on and off the field. To provide off-field support for the team coaches the club created the role of ladies team manager in 2020 and in April 2021 Lindsay Anfield was appointed as their first director of women's rugby league. A few weeks later five players from Anfield's former club, Castleford Tigers, joined the team. York reached the final of 2021 Challenge Cup and in the league they qualified for the play-off semi-finals. York began the 2022 season by winning the inaugural Women's Nines and went on to be the winners of the 2022 Women's Super League Leaders' Shield. They also had three players shortlisted for the 2022 Woman of Steel including Tara-Jane Stanley, who won the award, and Hollie-Mae Dodd, who was named 2022 Young Player of the Year. The third nominee was Sinead Peach who had been appointed co-captain with Langan at the start of the season.

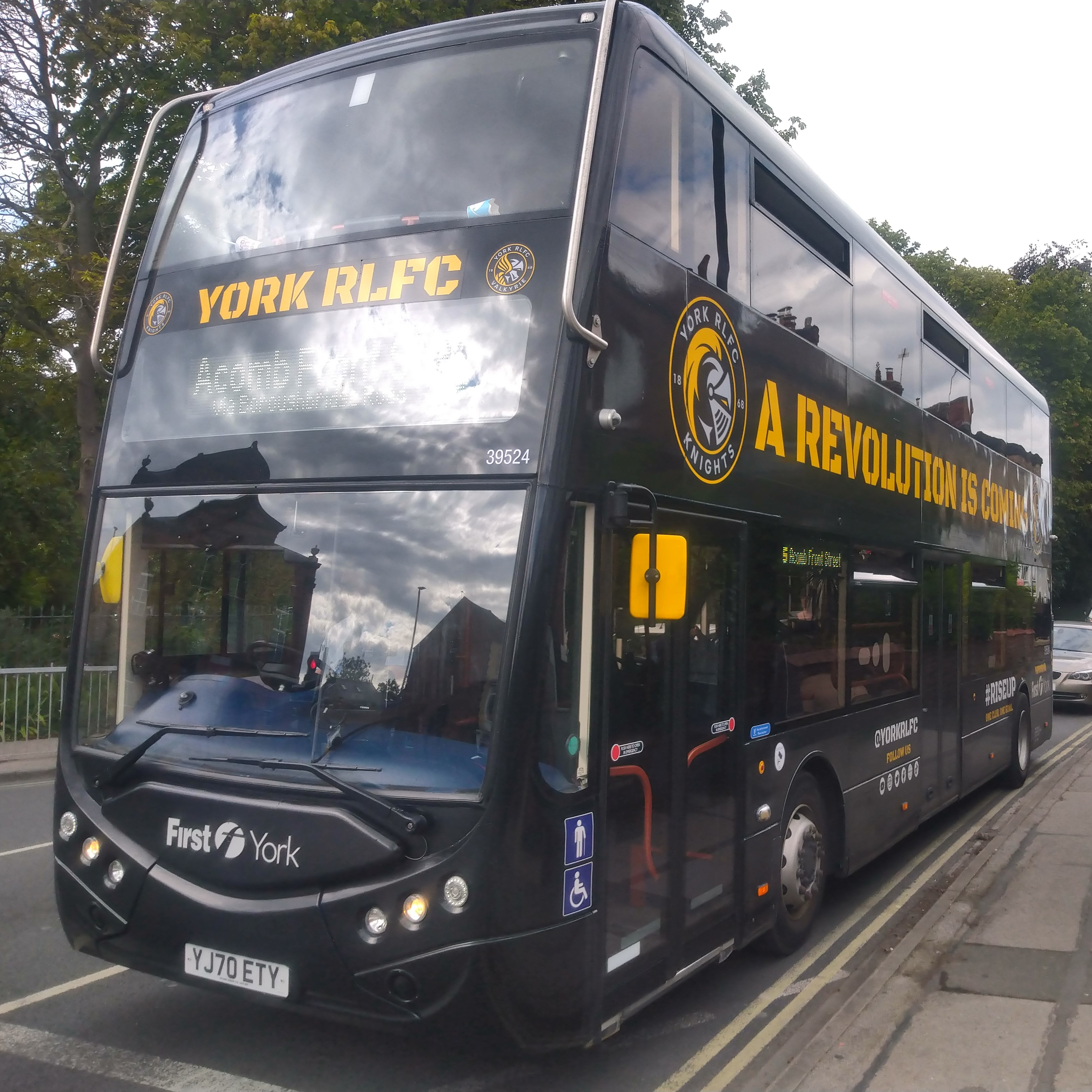
First York bus promoting York RLFC's re-branding

On 14 October 2022 York City Knights announced that the club had changed its name to York RLFC, with the men's team being known as the York Knights and the women's team becoming the Valkyrie. As part of the rebrand both teams introduced new logos. In January 2023, the team became the second in the Super League to announce that it would introduce payments for their players following the statement made in October by Leeds Rhinos.

In the 2023 season, York lost in the semi-finals of both the Women's Nines and the Challenge Cup, but went unbeaten in the league to retain their League Leaders' Shield and claimed the Super League title with a 16–6 win against Leeds in the Grand Final. Sinead Peach, who was promoted to team captain at the start of the season, won the 2023 Woman of Steel, and Lindsay Anfield was named Women's Super League Coach of the Year. On 27 October 2023, York became the first team in the Women's Super League to sign its players on to professional contracts with Peach, Stanley and Liv Wood each offered two-year deals. Two weeks later York had signed a squad of twenty players on to two-year professional contracts.

On 21 December 2023, York and Sheffield Eagles announced the establishment of a dual registration partnership. The teams faced each other in the group stage of the 2024 Challenge Cup in which York went on to reach the semi-finals before losing to St Helens. In the Super League, a third-place finish was followed by a play-off semi-final win over Leeds Rhinos. On 6 October, York defeated St Helens 18–8 in the Grand Final to become the first team to successfully defend the Super League title. At the 2024 end-of-season awards, Georgie Hetherington became the third York player to be named the Woman of Steel.

In the 2025 season, York continued their run of Challenge Cup semi-final appearances losing to St Helens 10–6. A third-place finish in the Super League was followed by a semi-final loss to St Helens in the play-offs. On 10 October 2025, Lindsay Anfield stepped down from her role as director of rugby league at the club and Leon Pryce was appointed as head coach. In 2026, the withdrawal of Salford Red Devils from the Challenge Cup meant that York and Barrow Raiders both progressed from Group D with York going on to exit the competition against Wigan Warriors in the semi-finals. York had lost to the same opponents a week earlier in the shield final of 2026 Women's Nines. In the 2026 Super League, York were fourth in the table at the mid-season split and then defeated Wigan in the final round of the Super Four competition to finish third and qualify for the semi-final. A 12–0 win over Leeds saw York reach the Grand Final which they won 8–6 against Wigan to secure a third Super League title.

== Home grounds ==
=== York St John University Sports Park ===
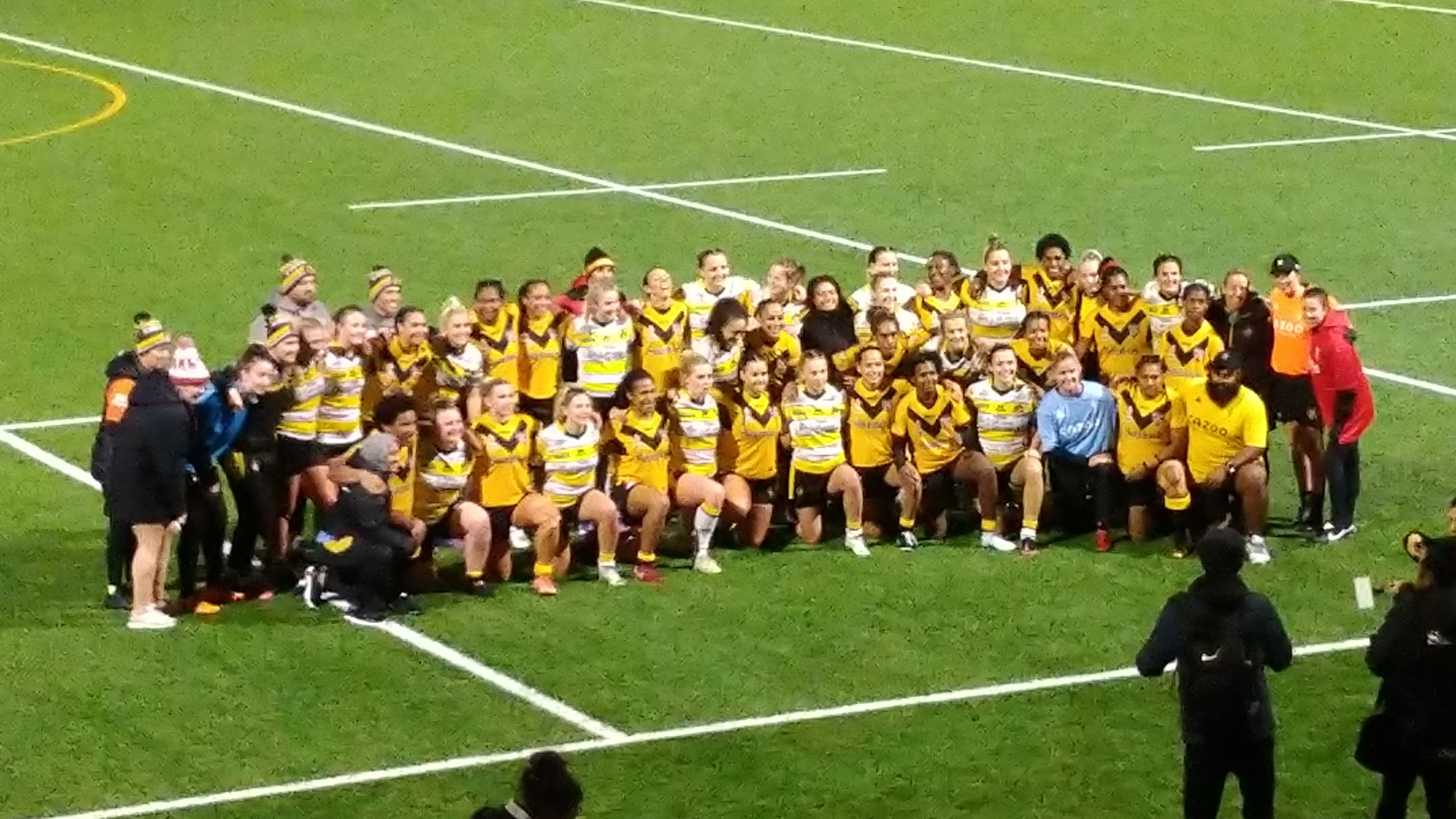
York Valkyrie with the PNG Orchids at York St John University Sports Park (20 October 2022)

In 2012 York St John University acquired a sports park on Haxby Road, York, which they named 'York St John University Sports Centre Nestlé Rowntree Park'. A multi-million-pound redevelopment included the creation of a 3G pitch for football and rugby. The use of the sports park as a training base for the rugby club is part of a partnership agreement with the university. The women's team also used it for playing their home matches. On 23 April 2017 York City Knights Ladies played their first match at the sports park winning 10–8 against Huddersfield St Joseph’s Ladies.

In 2021 a £1 million investment, partly funded by the Rugby League World Cup CreatedBy programme, was used to build a 4G pitch matching the specifications of York Community Stadium. During the 2021 Rugby League World Cup the sports park hosted the Cook Islands women's team and was the venue for the warm-up match between the Valkyrie and the Papua New Guinea Orchids on 20 October 2022.

=== York Community Stadium ===
The York Community Stadium, which is home to football club York City F.C. and York RLFC, was first proposed in 2009 but due to numerous delays it was not completed until December 2020. However, the restrictions at the start of the 2021 Super League season meant that matches were the split between venues in Leeds and Warrington. In May 2021, the Valkyrie played their first match at the Community Stadium; the semi-final of the Challenge Cup in which a hat-trick by Savannah Andrade saw York overcome Castleford 32–4. The stadium, which has a capacity of 8,500, was a venue for the 2021 Women's Rugby League World Cup. In October 2023, the crowd of 4,547 for the match between York Valkyrie and Leeds Rhinos set an attendance record for a RFL Women's Super League Grand Final. (Note: This record was surpassed the following season when 4,813 spectators watched York retain the title against St Helens at the Totally Wicked Stadium)

== Players ==
=== 2026 squad ===
2026 York Valkyrie squad
First team squad		Coaching staff
1 Tara-Jane Stanley – FB; 2 Eboni Partington – WG; 3 Emma Kershaw – WG, CE; 4 Tara Moxon – CE; 5 Chevelle Clarke – WG; 6 Sade Rihari – HB; 7 Ellie Williamson – HB; 8 Olivia Wood – PR; 9 Sinead Peach – HK; 10 Jas Bell – PR; 11 Tamzin Renouf – CE, SR; 12 Savannah Andrade – SR; 13 Rhiannion Marshall – LF	14 Izzy Bibby – HK; 15 Megan Pakulis – LF; 16 Agnes Wood; 17 Charlotte McDaid; 18 Isabelle Brennan; 19 Brooke Henderson – WG, CE; 20 T'Leesha Frederick-Maynard; 21 Petra Woods – FB	Head coach: Leon Pryce; Legend: (c) Captain(s); (vc) Vice-captain(s); Updated: 9 March 2026; Source(s):

=== Internationals ===
Players who earned international caps while playing for York City Knights Ladies or York Valkyrie:

- England
  - Savannah Andrade
  - Georgie Dagger
  - Hollie-Mae Dodd
  - Grace Field
  - Lacey Owen
  - Eboni Partington
  - Sinead Peach
  - Tamzin Renouf
  - Tara-Jane Stanley
  - Liv Wood
- Canada
  - Megan Pakulis
  - Petra Woods
- Ireland
  - Bettie Lambert
- Jamaica
  - Chevelle Clarke
- Scotland
  - Cerys Gregory
- Wales
  - Georgia Taylor
  - Agnes Wood

== Seasons ==
Season	League									Play-offs	Challenge Cup	Other competitions		Refs
Season	Division	P	W	D	L	F	A	Pts	Pos	Play-offs	Challenge Cup	Other competitions		Refs
2017	Merit League	7	6	1	0	280	58	13	1st	—N/a	R1	Challenge Shield	W	
2018	Super League	12	1	0	11	78	548	2	7th	—N/a	SF	—N/a		
2019	Super League	13	1	0	12	68	520	2	7th	—N/a	R2	Challenge Shield	RU	
2020	Super League	Cancelled due to the COVID-19 pandemic												
2021	Super League	7	5	0	2	198	106	10	4th	Lost in semi-final	RU	—N/a		
2021	Play-offs	4	2	0	2	52	66	4	3rd	Lost in semi-final	RU	—N/a		
2022	Super League	8	7	0	1	242	58	14	1st	Lost in Grand Final	SF	Nines	W	
2023	Super League	10	9	1	0	376	74	19	1st	Won in Grand Final	SF	Nines	SF	
2024	Super League	14	11	0	3	463	118	22	3rd	Won in Grand Final	SF	Nines	FD	
2025	Super League	14	10	0	4	462	166	20	3rd	Lost in semi-final	SF	Nines	QF	
2026	Super League	13	7	0	6	306	228	14	3rd	Won in Grand Final	SF	Nines: Ch	Sh: RU	

== Honours ==
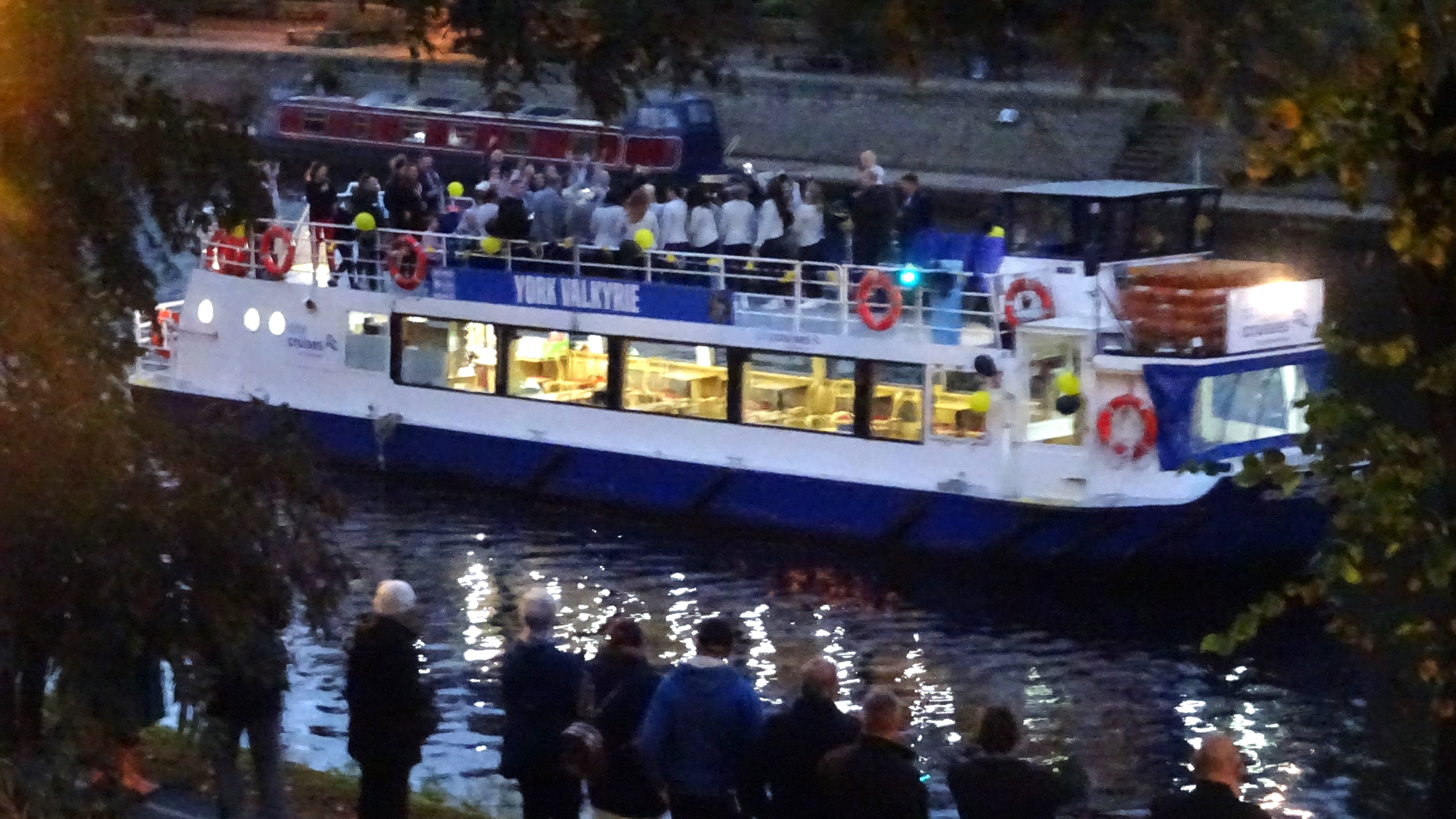
York celebrated their 2023 (pictured) and 2026 Super League campaigns with trophy parades on the River Ouse in York

- Challenge Shield (1): 2017
- RFL Women's Super League:
  - Winners (3): 2023, 2024, 2026
  - League Leaders' Shield (2): 2022, 2023
- RFL Women's Nines (1): 2022
