= Post Office Road =

Rugby league venue in Featherstone, England

- The Millennium Stadium
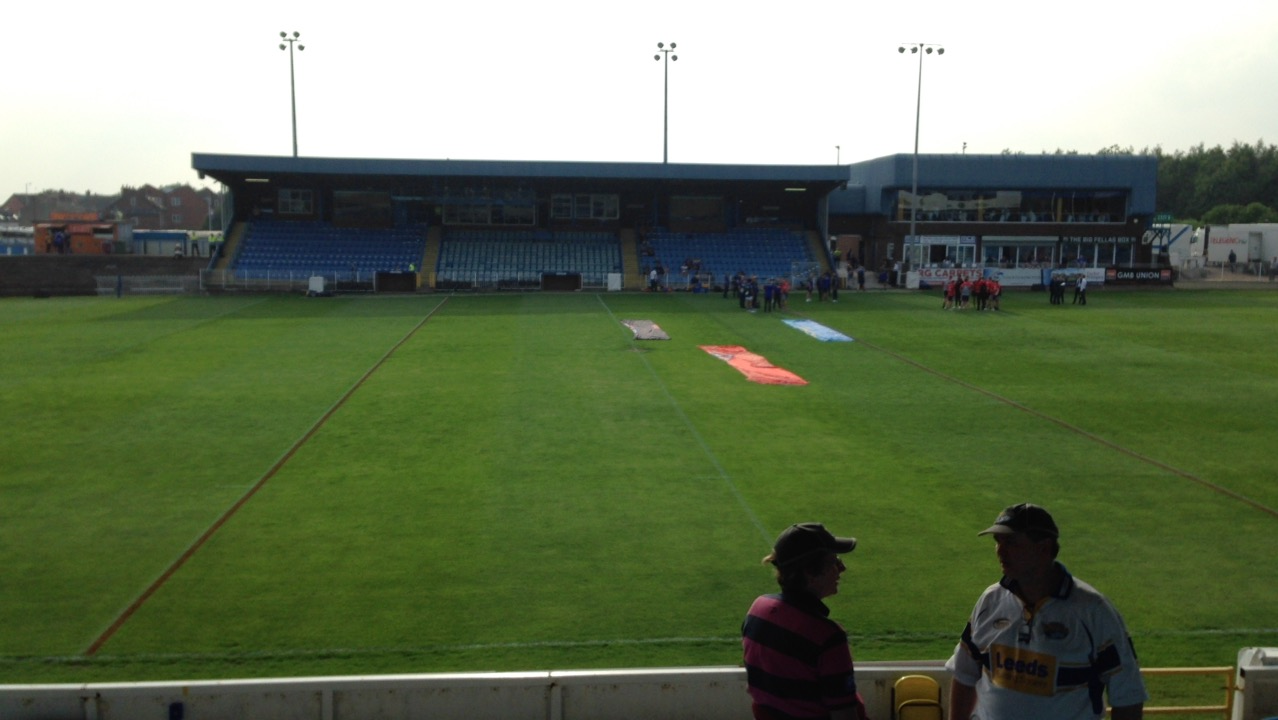
- Interactive map of Post Office Road
- Location: Featherstone, West Yorkshire, England
- Coordinates: 53°40′43″N 1°21′17″W
- Owner: Featherstone Rovers
- Operator: Featherstone Rovers
- Capacity: 6,954 standing 359
- Surface: Grass
- Record attendance: 17,000 – Featherstone vs St Helens, 1957

Construction
- Groundbreaking: 1904
- Opened: 1904

Tenants
- Featherstone Rovers (1904–present); Wakefield A.F.C. (2020–2023, 2024-2025)

Post Office Road (currently known as the Millennium Stadium for sponsorship purposes) is a rugby league ground in Featherstone, near Pontefract, West Yorkshire, England. It is the home of rugby league club Featherstone Rovers. The ground's current capacity is 6,954.

== History ==
The ground opened in 1904 and has been used by the club since their formation in 1908. The record attendance is 17,000 from a 1957 game against St. Helens.

In 2011, fans bought stands from the defunct Scarborough F.C.'s McCain Stadium and erected them at the railway end of the ground, replacing the terracing.

== Layout ==
=== North Stand ===
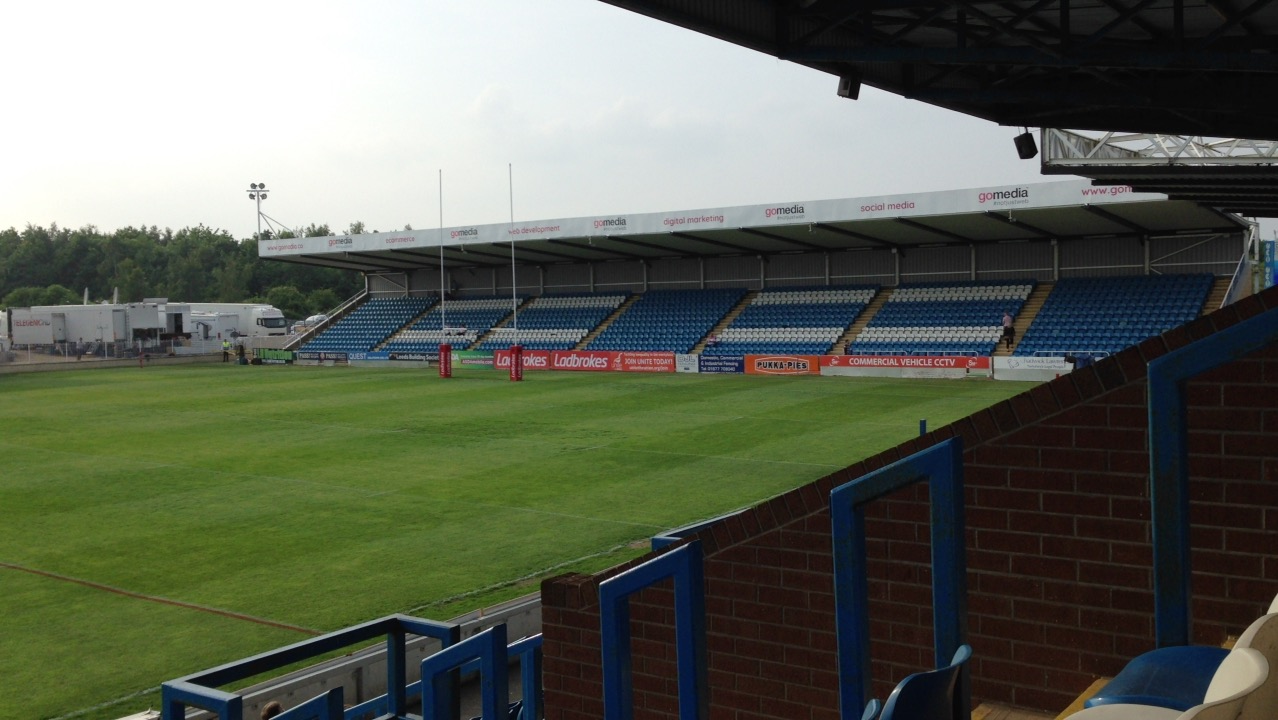

Capacity – (seated)
The North Stand or Railway End is the newest part of the ground after originally being terracing it was replaced in 2014 with seated stands which were taken from Scarborough's McCain Stadium. The North-East corner houses the scoreboard.

=== East Stand ===
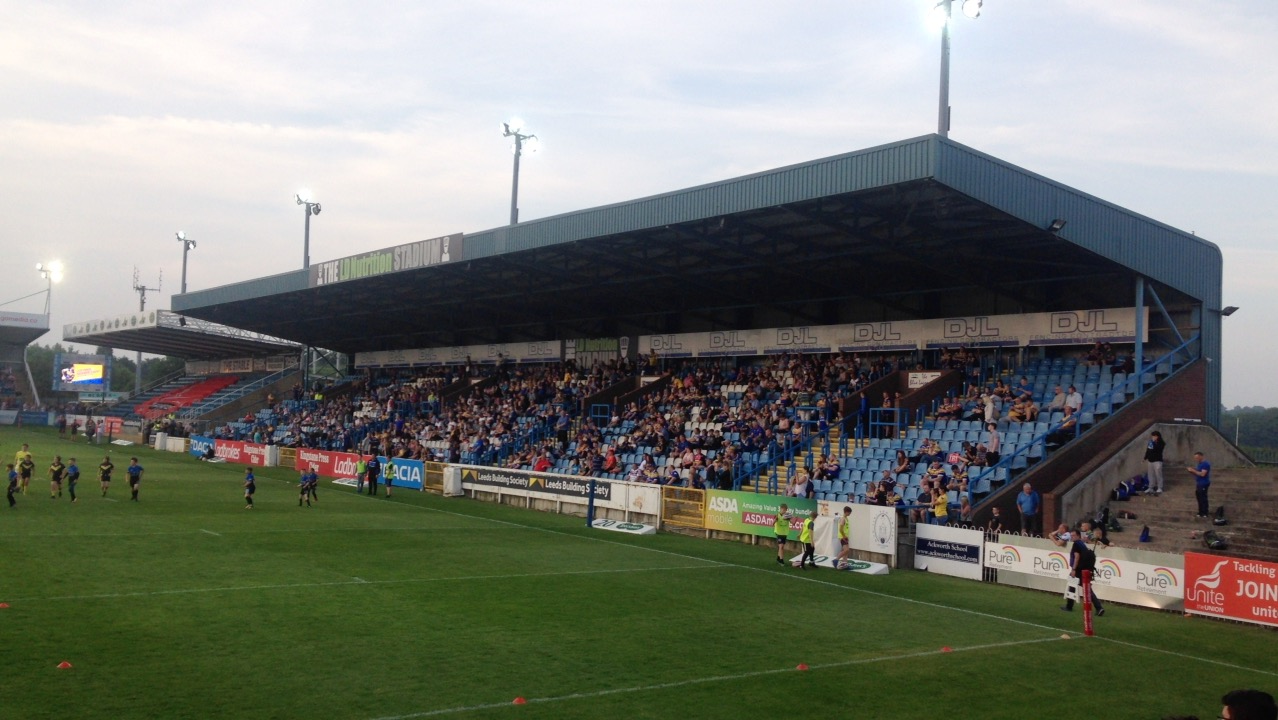
East Stand at Post Office Road

Capacity – (seated)
The Eastern side of the ground has two covered seated stands. The main stand on the halfway line houses bars and toilets while towards the Northern end of the ground, the smaller stand was erected in 2014 after it was relocated from Scarborough's McCain Stadium. To the Southern end of the stand there is a small amount of uncovered terracing.

=== South Stand ===
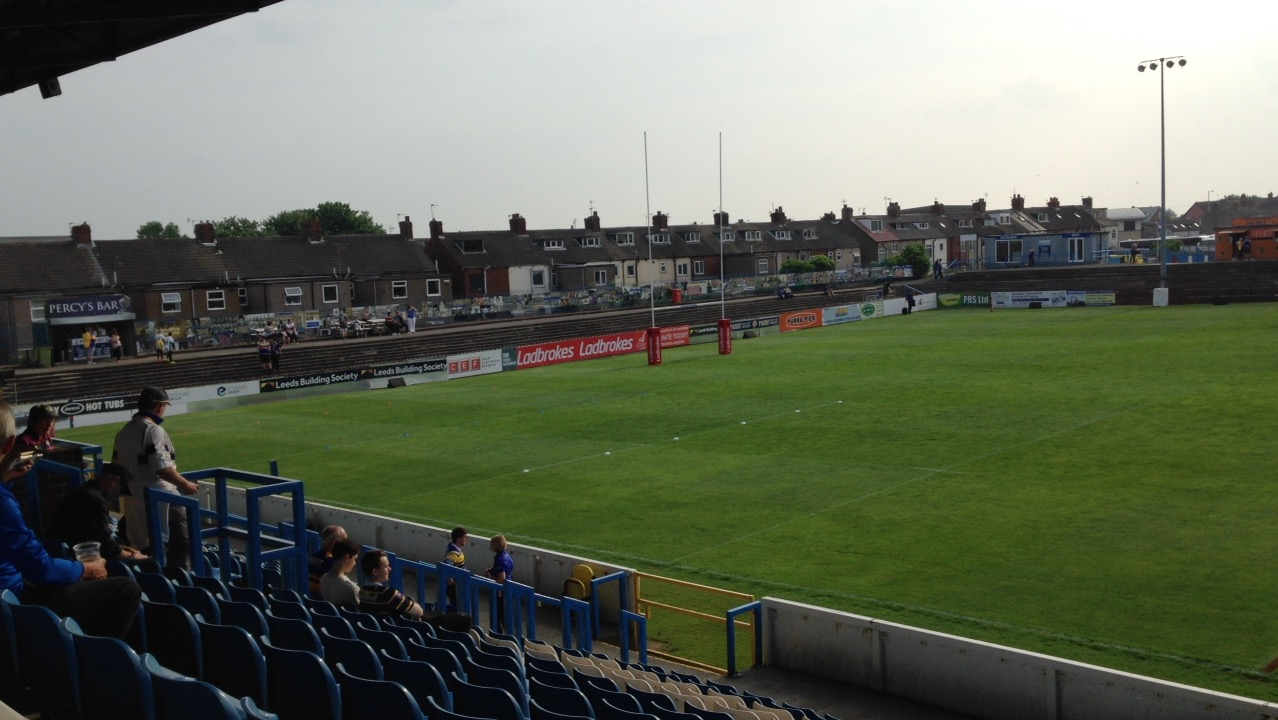
Post Office Road End

Capacity – (standing)
The South Stand or Post Office Road End is located behind the goal posts and is open terracing. Terrace houses overlook behind the stand and people have been known to sit on the roofs and watch games.

=== West Stand ===
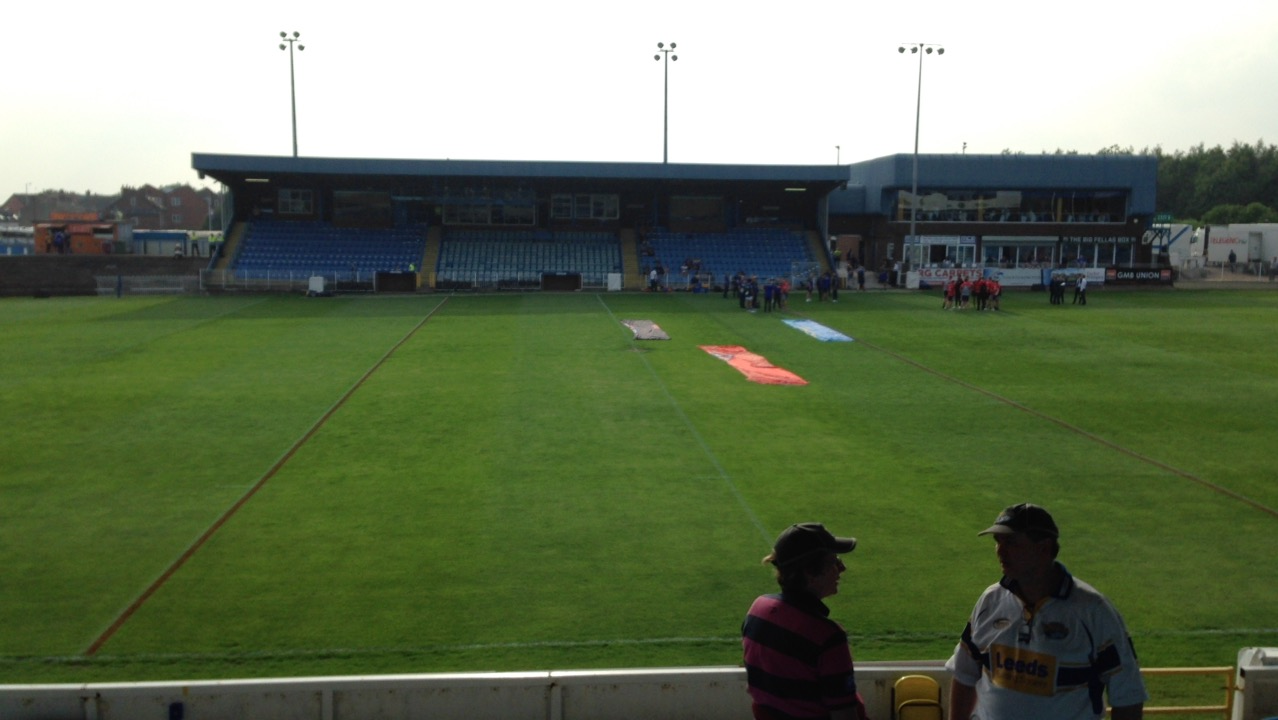
Main stand at Post Office Road

Capacity – (seated)
The West Stand is the Main Stand in the ground. It contains covered seating, where the TV gantry is and a small amount of uncovered terracing towards the South end of the ground. Towards the North end of the ground is the hospitality building which is connected to the main stand and also houses the changing rooms.

== Sponsorship and name changes ==
From 2007, it was announced that the ground would be renamed the Chris Moyles Stadium after the BBC Radio 1 presenter. This decision attracted criticism from some fans who felt Moyles had nothing to do with the tradition of the club or rugby league (he was born in Leeds and is famously a loyal Leeds United fan). However others saw it as a positive, good move and good publicity for the team. Moyles did not pay any money in the deal but mentioned Featherstone Rovers occasionally on his breakfast show. From 2009, the ground sponsorship was taken up by Bigfellas Nightclub following a two-year sponsorship deal. In 2017 local health food business LD Nutrition signed a deal to sponsor the stadium.

Year	Sponsor	Name	Ref.
1999–2006	Lionheart	Lionheart Stadium	
2007–2009	Chris Moyles	Chris Moyles Stadium	
2010–2016	Bigfellas Nightclub	Bigfellas Stadium	
2017–2020	LD Nutrition	LD Nutrition Stadium	
2020–	Millennium Support	The Millennium Stadium	

== Usage ==
=== Rugby League ===
==== Test matches ====
	Date		Result		Attendance	Notes
1	16 October 1995	Cook Islands	64-6	United States	3,133	1995 Emerging Nations
2	16 October 1995	Scotland	34-9	Russia	3,133	1995 Emerging Nations
3	13 November 2000	(United Kingdom) BARLA	60-2	Morocco		2000 Emerging Nations

==== Tour matches ====
	Date	Home	Score	Away	Attendance	Tour
1	1 October 1952	Featherstone Rovers	15-50	Australia	3,700	1952–53 Kangaroo tour
2	19 October 1955	Featherstone Rovers	6-7	New Zealand	4,042	1955–56 Kiwi tour
3	11 November 1959	Featherstone Rovers	23-15	Australia	7,671	1959–60 Kangaroo tour
3	2 October 1963	Featherstone Rovers	23-17	Australia	7,898	1963–64 Kangaroo tour
4	18 November 1973	Featherstone Rovers	13-18	Australia	5,659	1973 Kangaroo tour
5	24 September 1982	Featherstone Rovers	5-13	France		
6	11 October 1987	Featherstone Rovers	16-22	PNG	3,315	1987 Kumuls tour
7	7 November 1989	Featherstone Rovers	20-44	New Zealand	2,830	1989 Kiwi tour

==== Yorkshire Grand Finals ====
Post Office Road has hosted four Yorkshire Mens League Grand Final days in 2016, 2018, 2019 and 2024
