= Leeds Rhinos Women =

English rugby league club, based in Leeds, Yorkshire

Club information
- Full name: Leeds Rhinos Women Rugby League Football Club
- Nickname: The Rhinos
- Short name: Leeds
- Colours: Blue and Amber
- Founded: 2017; 9 years ago
- Website: therhinos.co.uk

Current details
- Grounds: Headingley Stadium, Leeds (19,700); University of Leeds Sports Park, Leeds
- Coach: Lois Forsell
- Captain: Hanna Butcher
- Competition: Women's Super League
- 2025: 4th
- Current season

Records
- Women's Super League: 2 (2019, 2022)
- Women's Challenge Cups: 2 (2018, 2019)
- League Leaders Shield: 1 (2018)

Leeds Rhinos Women are a rugby league team based in Leeds, West Yorkshire, England. The team is part of the Leeds Rhinos club and plays in the Women's Super League.

They were the RFL Women's Super League champions in 2019 and 2022, and from 2023 they became the first semi-professional women's rugby league team in the UK.

== History ==
The team was formed in September 2017 with the aid of the Leeds Rhinos Foundation. In December 2017 Rhino's forward, Adam Cuthbertson was appointed coach and Lois Forsell was named as captain in March 2018.

In the team's first season, they won the Women's Challenge Cup beating Castleford Tigers 20–14 in the final, at the Halliwell Jones Stadium, on 4 August 2018.

They successfully retained their title, after beating Castleford Tigers 16–10 in the final, at the University of Bolton Stadium, on 28 July 2019; in a repeat of the 2018 final. In October they beat Castleford again 20–12 to win the Grand Final.

Lois Forsell missed the 2019 season and was succeeded as captain by Courtney Winfield-Hill. Forsell succeeded Cuthbertson as coach in February 2020.

Winfield-Hill retired at the end of the 2022 season and was succeeded as captain by Hanna Butcher.

== Seasons ==
Season	League									Play-offs	Challenge Cup
Season	Division	P	W	D	L	F	A	Pts	Pos	Play-offs	Challenge Cup
2018	Super League	12	10	0	2	438	139	20	1st	Lost in Grand Final	W
2019	Super League	14	10	1	3	410	151	21	3rd	Won in Grand Final	W
2020	Super League	Cancelled due to the COVID-19 pandemic									
2021	Super League	11	10	0	1	434	82	22	2nd	Lost in Grand Final	SF
2022	Super League	8	5	0	3	320	116	10	3rd	Won in Grand Final	RU
2023	Super League	10	6	1	3	396	136	13	3rd	Lost in Grand Final	RU
2024	Super League	14	11	0	3	528	122	22	2nd	Lost in semi-final	RU
2025	Super League	14	9	1	4	586	186	19	4th	Lost in semi-final	SF

== 2025 squad ==
Leeds Rhinos Women Squad
First team squad			Coaching staff
(England) 1 Ruby Enright – FB; (England) 2 Ebony Stead – WG; (England) 3 Caitlin Beevers (c) – CE; (England) 4 Evie Cousins – FB; (England) 5 Sophie Nuttall – WG, CE; (Australia) 6 Mel Howard – SO; (England) 7 Ruby Walker – SH; (England) 8 Bella Sykes – PR, LF; (England) 9 Keara Bennett – HK; (England) 10 Izzy Northrop – PR; (England) 11 Shannon Brown – PR, LF; (England) 12 Lucy Murray – SR	(Wales) 13 Bethan Dainton – SR, LF; (England) 14 Ruby Bruce – HK; (England) 15 Ella Donnelly – SR; (England) 16 Kaiya Glynn – PR; (England) 17 Jenna Greening – SH; (England) 18 Olivia Whitehead – FB, WG; (England) 19 Grace Field – PR; (England) 20 Elle Frain – SR; (England) 21 Grace Short – SR; (England) 22 Connie Boyd – CE; (England) 23 Frankie Blakey – SH	(England) 24 Tally Bryer – SH; (England) 25 Lacey Owen=SR; (England) 26 Lily Thompson – LF; (England) 27 Jessica Sharp – PR	Head coach: (England) Lois Forsell; Legend: (c) Captain(s); (vc) Vice-captain(s); (gk) = Goal kicker; Updated: 21 August 2025; Source(s):

== Honours ==
=== League ===
- Super League

Winners (2): 2019, 2022
Runners-up (1): 2018

League Leaders' Shield

Winners (1): 2018
Runners-up (1): 2021

=== Cups ===
- Challenge Cup

Winners (2): 2018, 2019
Runners-up (3): 2022, 2023, 2024

- Women's Nines

Winners (2): 2023, 2026
Runners-up (1): 2022, 2024
