= 2024 Women's Challenge Cup final =

Rugby league match

2024 Women's Challenge Cup Final
Leeds Rhinos	St Helens
0	22
	1	2	Total
LEE	0	0	0
ST H	10	12	22
- Date: 8 June 2024
- Stadium: Wembley Stadium
- Location: London, United Kingdom
- Player of the Match: Zoe Harris (St Helens)
- Abide with Me: Maxwell Thorpe
- God Save the King: Katherine Jenkins
- Referee: Aaron Moore
- Attendance: 9,608

Broadcast partners
- Broadcasters: BBC

The 2024 Women's Challenge Cup Final was the 12th final of the Rugby Football League's Women's Challenge Cup knock-out competition. The 2024 was the second final at Wembley Stadium, and held on 8 June 2024.

The final was contested by Leeds Rhinos and St Helens.

== Background ==
The 2024 Women's Challenge Cup final was the third consecutive meeting between St Helens and Leeds Rhinos in the competition final.

St Helens were three times defending champions of the Challenge Cup having won in 2021, 2022, and 2023. They also won the tournament four times in a row between 2013 and 2016. Upon gaining their place in the final St Helens were third in Super League.

Leeds Rhinos entered the final aiming to avenge back to back defeats to St Helens in 2022 and 2023. They last won the competition in 2019 retaining it after their 2018 victory. Upon qualification Leeds were in second place in Super League, behind Wigan Warriors the team they eliminated in the semi-finals, but above St Helens.

== Route to the final ==
=== Leeds Rhinos ===
Round	Opposition	Venue	Score
Group Stage	Leigh Leopards	Twist Lane	52–4
Group Stage	Hull KR	Craven Park	90–0
Group Stage	Huddersfield Giants	West Park RUFC	54–10
Quarter-final	Warrington Wolves	Headingley	70–10
Semi-final	Wigan Warriors	Totally Wicked Stadium	34–20

=== St Helens ===
Round	Opposition	Venue	Score
Group Stage	London Broncos	Totally Wicked Stadium	64–0
Group Stage	Bradford Bulls	Odsal Stadium	F–W/O
Group Stage	Warrington Wolves	Dallam Playing Fields	58–6
Quarter-final	Huddersfield Giants	Crusaders Park	74–0
Semi-final	York Valkyrie	Eco-Power Stadium	32–2

== Pre-match ==
British singer Maxwell Thorpe sang the national anthem and Abide with Me ahead of the match. Thorpe was supported by British DJ Alex Simmons in providing the pre match entertainment. Following the death of Rob Burrow on 2 June, the RFL announced that Rob's death be commemorated with a minute's silence before kick-off and with a minute's applause during the seventh minute of the game.

Before the game, the Year 7 School's Final was played. Wigan's St Peter's Catholic High School won against Cardiff's Ysgol Gyfun Gymraeg Glantaf.

== Match details ==
Saturday, 8 June 2024
11:45am BST

Leeds Rhinos	0–22	St Helens
		Tries: Gaskin, Hook, McColm, Crowl; Goals: Gaskin (3/4)

Wembley Stadium, London
Referee: Aaron Moore
Touch judges: Neil Horton, Beth Neilson
Player of the Match: Zoe Harris (St Helens)

Team details
Leeds Rhinos		Position	St Helens
Name	Number	Position	Number	Name
Ruby Enright	1	Fullback	1	Beri Salihi
Liv Whitehead	18	Wing	20	Phoebe Hook
Caitlin Beevers	3	Centre	4	Erin Stott
Amy Hardcastle	4	Centre	3	Luci McColm
Evie Cousins	21	Wing	5	Leah Burke
Hanna Butcher	6	Stand off	6	Zoe Harris
Caitlin Casey	7	Scrum half	7	Faye Gaskin
Grace Field	19	Prop forward	8	Vicky Whitfield
Keara Bennett	9	Hooker	9	Tara Jones
Izzy Northrop	10	Prop forward	10	Chantelle Crowl
Shona Hoyle	11	Second row	11	Paige Travis
Lucy Murray	17	Second row	12	Emily Rudge
Bella Sykes	12	Loose forward	13	Jodie Cunningham
Sophie Robinson	2	Interchange	14	Naomi Williams
Zoe Hornby	8	Interchange	16	Darcy Stott
Bethan Dainton	13	Interchange	19	Katie Mottershead
Ella Donnelly	25	Interchange	24	Georgia Sutherland
Jenna Greening	22	Concussion substitute	17	Philippa Birchall
Lois Forsell		Coach		Matty Smith

The match officials were named on 4 June, with Aaron Moore as the referee, alongside Neil Horton, and Beth Neilson, the touch judges. Neilson became the first woman to be part of a senior final officiating team. (Note: Caitlin Beevers refereed the Year 7 Schools Final in 2018.)

== Post-match ==
Following the game, the men's final was played along with the 2024 1895 Cup final. The men's game saw an 18–8 victory to Wigan Warriors against Warrington Wolves. The 1895 Cup final saw Wakefield Trinity beat Sheffield Eagles 50–6.

== See also ==
- 2024 Men's Challenge Cup final
