= 2023 Women's Challenge Cup final =

2023 Women's Challenge Cup Final
Leeds Rhinos	St Helens
8	22
	1	2	Total
LEE	4	4	8
ST H	16	6	22
- Date: 12 August 2023, 12:00
- Stadium: Wembley Stadium
- Location: London, United Kingdom
- Player of the Match: Jodie Cunningham (St Helens)
- God Save The King and Abide with Me: Lizzie Jones
- Referee: James Vella
- Attendance: 8,338

Broadcast partners
- Broadcasters: BBC Two
- Commentators: Sharon Shortle; Andrea Dobson; Kyle Amor

The 2023 Women's Challenge Cup Final was the 11th final of the Rugby Football League's Women's Challenge Cup knock-out competition. The 2023 final marked the first time the final of the Women's Challenge Cup had been played at Wembley. The final was a repeat of the 2022 final with defending champions St Helens taking on last season's runners-up Leeds Rhinos.

The cup was won by St Helens, who won their third consecutive cup final, defeating Leeds Rhinos 22–8. St Helens captain, Jodie Cunningham was named player of the match. For the first time in its history, both the women's and men's final took place at Wembley Stadium on the same day – 12 August 2023.

== Background ==
St Helens are two times defending champions of the Challenge Cup having won in 2021 and 2022. They also won the tournament four times in a row between 2013 and 2016. Upon gaining their place in the final St Helens were second in Super League behind their semi-final opponents York Valkyrie. Leeds Rhinos entered the final aiming to avenge their 2022 defeat to St Helens. They last won the competition in 2019 retaining it after their 2018 victory. Upon qualification Leeds were in third place in Super League, one place and one point behind St Helens.

== Route to the final ==
=== St Helens ===
Round	Opposition	Venue	Score
Group Stage	London Broncos	The Rock	76–0
Group Stage	Castleford Tigers	Wheldon Road	106–0
Group Stage	Warrington Wolves	Totally Wicked Stadium	36–4
Quarter-final	Warrington Wolves	Totally Wicked Stadium	36–0
Semi-final	York Valkyrie	Halliwell Jones Stadium	17–16

=== Leeds Rhinos ===
Round	Opposition	Venue	Score
Group Stage	Bradford Bulls	Weetwood Sports Park	72–0
Group Stage	Oulton Raidettes	Oulton forefitted game	
Group Stage	Huddersfield Giants	Laund Hill	54–0
Quarter-final	Leigh Leopards	Headingley	54–0
Semi-final	Wigan Warriors	Headingley	16–4

== Match details ==
Saturday, 12 August
12:00 (BST)

Leeds Rhinos	8–22	St Helens
Tries: Robinson (25'); Beevers (43')	report	Tries: Jones (13'); Hook (15'); Partington (18'); Hoyle (47'); Goals: Taylor (3/5) 13', 15', 64' (penalty)

Wembley Stadium, London
Attendance: 8,338
Referee: James Vella
Touch judges: Ryan Cox, Denton Arnold
Player of the Match: Jodie Cunningham

Team details
Leeds Rhinos		Position	St Helens
Name	Number	Position	Number	Name
Ruby Enright	31	Fullback	6	Zoe Harris
Sophie Nuttall	5	Wing	28	Phoebe Hook
Hanna Butcher (c)	4	Centre	11	Paige Travis
Caitlin Beevers	3	Centre	2	Luci McColm
Sophie Robinson	2	Wing	3	Eboni Partington
Caitlin Casey	26	Stand off	21	Amy Taylor
Jenna Greening	24	Scrum half	7	Faye Gaskin
Dannielle Anderson (substituted off) 19'	10	Prop forward	10	Chantelle Crowl
Jasmine Cudjoe (substituted off) 34' (substituted on) 58'	15	Hooker	9	Tara Jones
Zoe Hornby (substituted off) 36' (substituted on) 58'	8	Prop forward	17	Philippa Birchall
Lucy Murray	28	Second row	8	Shona Hoyle
Amy Hardcastle	11	Second row	12	Emily Rudge
Bethan Dainton	12	Loose forward	13	Jodie Cunningham (c)
Elle Frain (substituted on) 36' (substituted off) 58'	19	Interchange	4	Naomi Williams
Eloise Hayward	21	Interchange	14	Vicky Whitfield
Tara Moxon (substituted on) 34' (substituted off) 58'	20	Interchange	15	Lucie Sams
Izzy Northrop (substituted on) 19'	18	Interchange	19	Katie Mottershead
Bethany Lockwood	16	Concussion substitute	1	Rebecca Rotheram
Lois Forsell		Coach		Matty Smith

== Post match ==
Following both the women's and men's challenge cup final, Wembley will host the Year 7 boys schools' final and the final of the 2023 1895 Cup. The 1895 Cup Final saw Halifax Panthers beat Batley Bulldogs 12–10. The men's final saw Leigh Leopards beat Hull KR 17–16.
