= 2023 RFL Women's Super League =

Women's rugby league competition in Great Britain

- Duration: 10 rounds + playoffs
- Teams: 12
- Matches played: 60
- Points scored: 2,419
- Champions: York Valkyrie
- League Leaders Shield: York Valkyrie
- Biggest home win: St Helens 66–0 Huddersfield Giants (2 July 2023)
- Biggest away win: Warrington Wolves 0–88 Leeds Rhinos (2 July 2023)
- Woman of Steel: Sinead Peach

Promotion and relegation
- Promoted from Group 2: Featherstone Rovers; Barrow Raiders

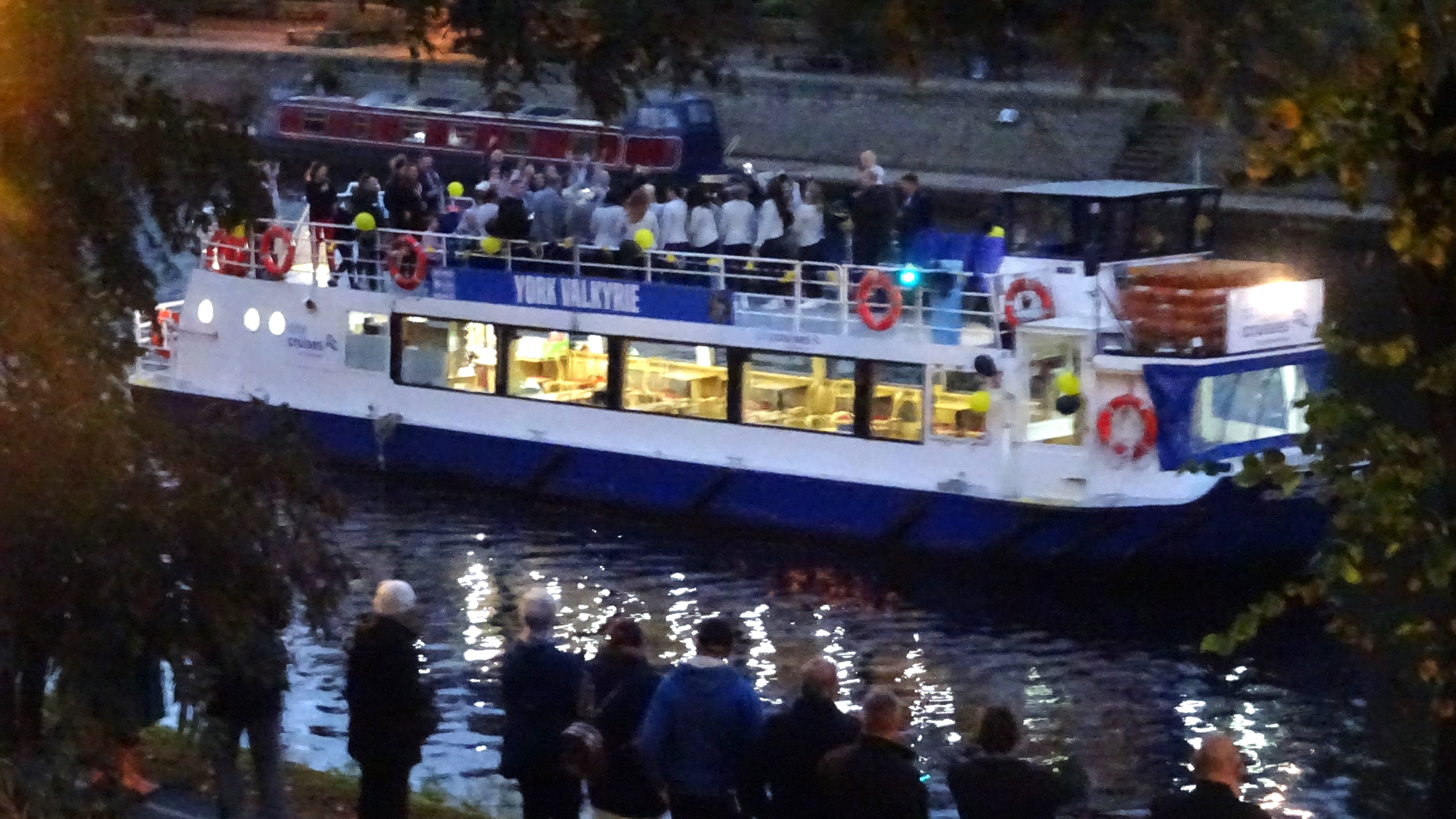
York Valkyrie celebrated their successful 2023 Super League campaign with a trophy parade on the River Ouse in York

The 2023 RFL Women's Super League (also known as the Betfred Women's Super League for sponsorship reasons) was the seventh season of the Women's Super League, for female players in clubs affiliated to the Rugby Football League (RFL).

Leeds Rhinos were the defending champions having defeated York City Knights in the 2022 Grand Final. Since then both teams had announced that they would become semi-professional for the 2023 season and York had been rebranded as York Valkyrie. On 9 April, they faced each other at Headingley in the opening match of the 2023 season. York went unbeaten through the regular season to retain the League Leaders' Shield and defeated Leeds 16–6 in the Grand Final on 23 September.

In a change from the 2022 season the 12 teams were split into two groups of six. In Group 1 Huddersfield, Leeds, St Helens, Wigan and York were joined by Warrington who had won the 2022 promotion final. Group 2 comprised Barrow, Bradford, Castleford, Featherstone, Salford and Leigh Leopards who replaced Leigh Miners Rangers.

This was the last season of the two-group Super League before a restructuring of the league for 2024. The six teams in Group 1 were joined in the 2024 Super League by the team finishing first in Group 2 and the winners of the Group 2 play-offs. Featherstone Rovers won the automatic promotion place while Barrow Raiders won the play-offs for the second promotion place.

== Pre-season ==
On 14 October 2022, York City Knights became York RLFC and their women's team was rebranded as York Valkyrie. A week later it was announced Leigh Leopards would take the place of Leigh Miners Rangers in the Super League following a merger agreement between the clubs. On 30 October, Leeds Rhinos announced that their women's team would become semi-professional for the 2023 season. This was followed by York Valkyrie on 4 January 2023, marking the first and second semi-professional women's rugby league clubs in the United Kingdom.

== Teams ==
=== Group 1 teams ===
Locations of Group 1 Teams in Northern England
- Huddersfield Giants
- Leeds Rhinos
- St Helens
- Warrington Wolves
- Wigan Warriors
- York Valkyrie

=== Group 2 teams ===
Locations of Group 2 Teams in Northern England
- Barrow Raiders
- Bradford Bulls
- Castleford Tigers
- Featherstone Rovers
- Leigh Leopards
- Salford Red Devils

== Regular season ==
The season began on 9 April, with current champions Leeds taking on York at Headingley whilst the 10 remaining teams started their season on 16 April. The Leeds-York match was a repeat of the 2022 Grand Final and attracted a new attendance record of 5,308 for a Women's Super League fixture. York remained unbeaten to become the first team to win the League Leaders' Shield in successive seasons of the Women's Super League. They were joined in the Group 1 play-offs by Leeds, St Helens and Wigan. Due to the restructuring of the league for 2024 Warrington and Huddersfield were not at risk of relegation. The eight-team 2024 Super League includes all six teams from Group 1 who will be joined by the team finishing first in Group 2 and the winners of the Group 2 play-offs contested by the teams finishing second to fifth in the group. The top spot in Group 2 was not decided until the final day of the regular season. Leigh were ahead of Barrow and Featherstone by one point, but lost to Barrow in their final game. Featherstone, who had started the day in third, also won and overtook Barrow on points difference to claim the automatic promotion place.

=== Group 1 table ===
| Pos | Team | Pld | W | D | L | PF | PA | PD | Pts | Qualification |
|---|---|---|---|---|---|---|---|---|---|---|
| 1 | York Valkyrie | 10 | 9 | 1 | 0 | 376 | 74 | +302 | 19 | Advance to semi-finals |
| 2 | St Helens | 10 | 7 | 0 | 3 | 362 | 116 | +246 | 14 | Advance to semi-finals |
| 3 | Leeds Rhinos | 10 | 6 | 1 | 3 | 396 | 136 | +260 | 13 | Advance to semi-finals |
| 4 | Wigan Warriors | 10 | 3 | 1 | 6 | 116 | 252 | −136 | 7 | Advance to semi-finals |
| 5 | Warrington Wolves | 10 | 2 | 1 | 7 | 128 | 450 | −322 | 5 | |
| 6 | Huddersfield Giants | 10 | 1 | 0 | 9 | 102 | 452 | −350 | 2 | |

=== Group 2 table ===
| Pos | Team | Pld | W | D | L | PF | PA | PD | Pts | Qualification |
|---|---|---|---|---|---|---|---|---|---|---|
| 1 | Featherstone Rovers (P) | 10 | 8 | 0 | 2 | 356 | 103 | +253 | 16 | Qualification for 2024 Super League |
| 2 | Barrow Raiders (P) | 10 | 8 | 0 | 2 | 336 | 88 | +248 | 16 | Advance to semi-finals |
| 3 | Leigh Leopards | 10 | 7 | 1 | 2 | 271 | 108 | +163 | 15 | Advance to semi-finals |
| 4 | Salford Red Devils | 10 | 4 | 0 | 6 | 174 | 248 | −74 | 8 | Advance to semi-finals |
| 5 | Bradford Bulls | 10 | 2 | 1 | 7 | 124 | 350 | −226 | 5 | Advance to semi-finals |
| 6 | Castleford Tigers (R) | 10 | 0 | 0 | 10 | 44 | 408 | −364 | 0 | Relegated to 2024 Championship |

== Playoffs ==
In the play-offs, semi-final wins for Barrow (over Bradford) and Leigh (over Salford) meant they faced each other again in the Group 2 promotion final with Barrow winning 14–8 to earn their place in the Super League for 2024. The other three teams, as well as Castleford Tigers who finished bottom of the group, will play in the Regional League Roses (part of the new second tier) in 2024. In Group 1 York won 22–6 over Wigan and Leeds defeated St Helens in golden point extra time to set up a repeat of the 2022 Grand Final. York were crowned champions following a 16–6 win against Leeds in front of a Grand Final record crowd of 4,547 at York Community Stadium.

=== Group 1 ===
Semi-finals
1 | York Valkyrie | 22
4 | Wigan Warriors | 6
2 | St Helens | 16
3 | Leeds Rhinos | 20

Grand Final
1 | York Valkyrie | 16
3 | Leeds Rhinos | 6

==== Group 1: Semi-finals ====
23 September 2023
15:30 BST (UTC+01)

| York Valkyrie | 22–6 | Wigan Warriors |
|---|---|---|
| Tries: Whitehead 22, Gale 24′, Stanley 36′, Owen 74′ Goals: Stanley (3/5) 25', 37', 75' | Report | Tries: Banks 3'; Goals: Salihi (1/1) 4' |

York Community Stadium

23 September 2023
18:00 BST (UTC+01)

| St Helens | 16–20 (a.e.t.) | Leeds Rhinos |
|---|---|---|
| Tries: Jones 31', Rudge 51'; Goals: Taylor (4/4) 6', 32', 37', 52' | Report | Tries: Robinson 40', 83, Beevers 55', Murray 58'; Goals: Enright (2/4) 15, 55' |

Totally Wicked Stadium
Attendance: 1,047

==== Grand final ====
Final

8 October 2023
15:00 BST (UTC+01:00)

| York Valkyrie | 16–6 | Leeds Rhinos |
|---|---|---|
| Tries: Renouf 15', Stanley 40', Owen 62'; Goals: Stanley (2/4) 59' (pen), 63' | | Tries: Casey 80'; Goals: Enright 45' (pen) |

York Community Stadium
Attendance: 4,547
Referee: Liam Rush

Team details
| York Valkyrie | | Position | Leeds Rhinos |
| Name | Number | Position | Number | Name |
|---|---|---|---|---|
| Tara-Jane Stanley | 1 | FB | 31 | Ruby Enright |
| Emma Kershaw | 4 | WG | 5 | Sophie Nuttall |
| Tamzin Renouf | 3 | CE | 11 | Amy Hardcastle |
| Carrie Roberts | 30 | CE | 3 | Caitlin Beevers |
| Georgie Hetherington | 19 | WG | 2 | Sophie Robinson |
| Sade Rihari | 6 | SO | 26 | Caitlin Casey |
| Liv Gale | 7 | SH | 4 | Hanna Butcher |
| Elisa Akpa | 29 | PR | 18 | Izzy Northrop |
| Sinead Peach | 9 | HK | 9 | Keara Bennett |
| Aimee Staveley | 14 | PF | 8 | Zoe Hornby |
| Savanah Andrade | 12 | SR | 28 | Lucy Murray |
| Lacey Owen | 11 | SR | 24 | Jenna Greening |
| Liv Wood | 8 | LF | 12 | Bethan Dainton |
| Jas Bell | 10 | IN | 15 | Jasmine Cudjoe |
| Rhiannon Marshall | 15 | IN | 16 | Kaya Glynn |
| Ashleigh Hyde | 16 | IN | 22 | Bethany Lockwood |
| Daisy Sanderson | 23 | IN | 32 | Isabella Sykes |
| Jess Sharp | 27 | CS | 20 | Tara Moxon |
| Lindsay Anfield | | Coach | | Lois Forsell |

=== Group 2 ===
Semi-finals
2 | Barrow Raiders | 62
5 | Bradford Bulls | 0
3 | Leigh Leopards | 28
4 | Salford Red Devils | 10

Final
2 | Barrow Raiders | 14
3 | Leigh Leopards | 8

==== Group 2: Semi-finals ====
Semi-final 1

24 September 2023
12:00 BST (UTC+01:00)

| Barrow Raiders | 62–0 | Bradford Bulls |

Craven Park
Referee: Sam Houghton

Semi-final 2

24 September 2023
15:00 BST (UTC+01:00)

| Leigh Leopards | 28–0 | Salford Red Devils |

Leigh Sports Village

==== Promotion final ====
8 October 2023
12:00 BST (UTC+01:00)

| Barrow Raiders | 14–8 | Leigh Leopards |

York Community Stadium
Referee: E Burrow

== End of season awards ==
The End of season awards took place on 10 October 2023, alongside the men's Super League, Championship, and League 1 awards.

The winners were:

Woman of Steel: Sinead Peach (York Valkyrie)
Young player of the year: Caitlin Casey (Leeds Rhinos)
Coach of the year: Lindsay Anfield (York Valkyrie)
