= 2019 Women's Challenge Cup =

Women's rugby league competition

- Duration: 6 rounds
- Number of teams: 27
- Broadcast partners: BBC Sport
- Winners: Leeds Rhinos
- Runners-up: Castleford Tigers
- Biggest home win: Warrington Wolves 80–12 Wigan St Patricks
- Biggest away win: Wakefield Trinity 0–100 Castleford Tigers
- Player of the Match: Courtney Hill

The 2019 RFL Women's Challenge Cup (known as the 2019 Coral Women's Challenge Cup for sponsorship reasons) was an English rugby league knockout tournament competed for by 27 teams during the summer of 2019. The competition was sponsored by Coral who were also the sponsor of the men's Challenge Cup. Defending their title were Leeds Rhinos who beat Castleford Tigers 20–14 in the final at the Halliwell Jones Stadium on 4 August 2018.

Leeds successfully defended their title after beating Castleford Tigers 16–10, in a repeat of the 2018 Final.

== Format ==
The competition is knockout tournament and was played over six rounds. The teams competing for the cup were the eight teams of the Women's Super League who entered the competition at the second round stage, the eight teams of the Women's Championship who entered the competition at the first round stage, the nine teams of the Women's League 1 and teams representing the British Army and the Royal Air Force.

The number of teams entering the competition necessitated the introduction of a preliminary round. All 11 teams from League 1 and the armed forces were entered into the preliminary round draw to be played on 21 April, three ties were drawn, and the five teams not drawn were given a bye to the first round.

The first round consisted of eight ties and was played on 5 May; (The winners from the preliminary round, the five teams with a bye and the eight teams of the Championship.) The second round also consisted of eight ties, featuring the winners from the first round and the eight Super League teams, and was played on 26 May. After the second round, there was the quarter-finals (23 June), semi-finals (7 July) and the final. The final was played at the University of Bolton Stadium on Saturday 27 July 2019 and was part of a triple header bill with the semi-finals of the men's Challenge Cup.

== Preliminary round ==
The draw for the preliminary round was made on 14 March 2019, the five teams who were not drawn and were awarded a bye to the first round were the Army and League 1 sides East Leeds, Halifax, Keighley Albion and Wigan St Patricks. The three ties drawn were due to be played on 21 April but only one tie was played as West Leeds Eagles and Whitley Bay Barbarians withdrew from the competition before the ties were played and the ties awarded to their opponents, Hull Kingston Rovers and Rochdale Hornets respectively. In the one game played Cutsyke lost at home 16–20 to the RAF.

== First round ==
Prior to the draw for the first round being made East Leeds withdrew from the competition and were replaced by Featherstone Lionesses. The draw for the first round was made on 22 April 2019, the winners from the preliminary round joined the teams that received a bye. The eight ties drawn were played on 4-5 May.

| Home | Score | Away |
|---|---|---|
| British Army | 34–12 | Huddersfield Giants |
| Featherstone Lionesses | 18–46 | Stanningley |
| Halifax | 24–14 | Hull KR |
| Keighley Albion | 24–22 | Hull FC |
| RAF | 28–18 | Leigh Miners Rangers |
| Rochdale Hornets | 12–56 | Barrow |
| Warrington Wolves | 80–12 | Wigan St Patricks |
| Widnes Vikings | 16–14 | Oulton Raidettes |

== Second round ==
The draw for the second round was made on 5 May 2019, the eight teams from the Women's Super League join the winners from the first round. The ties were played on 23 and 26 May.

| Home | Score | Away |
|---|---|---|
| Barrow | 18–38 | Warrington Wolves |
| British Army | 14–50 | Wigan Warriors |
| Castleford Tigers | 48–4 | Featherstone Rovers |
| Keighley Albion | 50–9 | Halifax |
| RAF | 0–56 | Bradford Bulls |
| Stanningley | 0–96 | St Helens |
| Wakefield Trinity | 20–6 | Widnes Vikings |
| York City Knights | 0–70 | Leeds Rhinos |

== Quarter-finals ==
The draw for the quarter-finals was made on 2 June 2019 at Odsal Stadium after the men's Challenge Cup draw. The ties were played on 23 June.

| Home | Score | Away | Venue | Referee | Attendance |
|---|---|---|---|---|---|
| Castleford Tigers | 48–8 | Bradford Bulls | Mend-A-Hose Jungle | | 1,492 |
| Keighley Albion | 24–26 | Wakefield Trinity |
| Leeds Rhinos | 74–0 | Warrington Wolves | Headingley |
| St Helens | 36–0 | Wigan Warriors | Totally Wicked Stadium |

== Semi-finals ==
The draw for the semi-finals was made on 23 June 2019. The ties were played on 7 July.

| Home | Score | Away | Venue | Referee | Attendance |
|---|---|---|---|---|---|
| St Helens | 10–16 | Leeds Rhinos | Totally Wicked Stadium | L. Rush | 738 |
| Wakefield Trinity | 0–100 | Castleford Tigers | Mobile Rocket Stadium | J. Turner | 913 |

After the game between Castleford and Wakefield it was discovered that Castleford had fielded an illegible player, Francesca Townend. After consideration the RFL decided to let the result of the game stand and not disqualify Castleford from the competition as the RFL board decided that it was a "genuine administrative error by the club rather than a deliberate act". Any further action against the club or Townend was passed to the Competition Discipline Panel for discussion at a later date.

== Final ==
The final saw a repeat of the 2018 Final between holders Leeds Rhinos and Castleford Tigers, and was played at The University of Bolton Stadium on 27 July 2019, as part of a triple header bill with the semi-finals of the men's Challenge Cup.

27 July 2019
11:15

| Castleford Tigers | 10–16 | Leeds Rhinos |
|---|---|---|
| Tries: Rhiannon Marshall, Tamzin Renouf; Goals: Tara-Jane Stanley (1/2) | report | Tries: Fran Goldthorp, Caitlin Beevers, Courtney Hill; Goals: Courtney Hill (2/3) |

University of Bolton Stadium
Attendance: 4,000 (est) (Note: The game was the first game in a triple-header with the men's Challenge Cup semi-finals between Warrington Wolves vs Hull F.C. and Halifax vs St. Helens, total attendance was 24,364 with an estimate of 4,000 being present for this game)
Referee: Cameron Worsley

Teams
Castleford Tigers Backs: Tara-Jane Stanley, Hollie Dodd, Lacey Owen, Olivia Grace, Kelsey Gentles, Georgia Roche, Claire Garner
Forwards: Grace Field, Sinead Peach, Emma Lumley, Tamzin Renouf, Shona Hoyle, Rhiannon Marshall
Interchanges: Sammy Watts, Kirsty Higo (not used), Esme Reynolds, Jasmine Cudjoe

Leeds Rhinos Backs: Caitlin Beevers, Sophie Nuttall, Sophie Robinson, Chloe Kerigan, Fran Goldthorp, Hanna Butcher, Courtney Hill
Forwards: Danielle Anderson, Tasha Gaines, Amy Johnson, Aimee Staveley, Charlotte Booth, Shannon Lacey
Interchanges: Danika Priim, Keara Benenett, Ellie Frain, Ellie Oldroyd

== See also ==
- 2019 Men's Challenge Cup
