= 2026 RFL Women's Super League =

Women's rugby league competition in Great Britain

- Duration: 13 rounds + playoffs
- Teams: 8
- Matches played: 24
- Points scored: 1,296
- Champions: York Valkyrie
- League Leaders Shield Winners: Wigan Warriors
- Runners-up: Wigan Warriors
- Biggest home win: Leeds Rhinos 72–0 Leigh Leopards (27 June)
- Biggest away win: Barrow Raiders 6–74 Wigan Warriors (24 May)
- Woman of Steel: Jenna Foubister

Promotion and relegation
- Promoted from Championship: London Broncos
- Relegated to Championship: Leigh Leopards

The 2026 RFL Women's Super League (also known as the Betfred Women's Super League for sponsorship reasons) was the tenth season of the Women's Super League, for female players in clubs affiliated to the Rugby Football League (RFL).

The competition, which began on 16 May, consisted of 13 rounds starting with each team playing each other once before a mid-season split into two groups of four, after which teams played the three teams in their half of the table twice more. After round 13, the League Leaders' Shield was awarded to the team in first place in the top four group (Super Four) who qualified for the grand final against the winner of a semi-final between the teams finishing second and third. The team finishing last in the bottom four group (Shield) faced the winners of the 2026 Championship in a promotion/relegation play-off.

Wigan Warriors were the defending champions, hoping to become the first team to win back to back treble, but they narrowly lost 6–8 to York Valkyrie who became the first team to win three grand finals.

== Teams ==
Locations of 2026 Super League teams

The eight clubs in the 2026 Super League were all from Northern England. Seven teams from the 2025 Super League were joined by Featherstone Rovers who, after winning the 2025 Championship, replaced Warrington Wolves.

- Barrow Raiders
- Featherstone Rovers
- Huddersfield Giants
- Leeds Rhinos
- Leigh Leopards
- St Helens
- Wigan Warriors
- York Valkyrie

== Tables ==
=== Regular season ===
| Pos | Team | Pld | W | D | L | PF | PA | PD | Pts | Qualification (Note: should teams have the same points difference, then position is decided by points scored percentage (points scored, divided by points conceded, multiplied by 100).) |
|---|---|---|---|---|---|---|---|---|---|---|
| 1 | Wigan Warriors | 7 | 7 | 0 | 0 | 350 | 82 | +268 | 14 | Advance to Super 4s |
| 2 | Leeds Rhinos | 7 | 6 | 0 | 1 | 302 | 62 | +240 | 12 | Advance to Super 4s |
| 3 | St Helens | 7 | 5 | 0 | 2 | 232 | 106 | +126 | 10 | Advance to Super 4s |
| 4 | York Valkyrie | 7 | 4 | 0 | 3 | 208 | 92 | +116 | 8 | Advance to Super 4s |
| 5 | Huddersfield Giants | 7 | 3 | 0 | 4 | 136 | 210 | −74 | 6 | Consigned to Shield |
| 6 | Leigh Leopards | 7 | 2 | 0 | 5 | 64 | 292 | −228 | 4 | Consigned to Shield |
| 7 | Featherstone Rovers | 7 | 1 | 0 | 6 | 44 | 302 | −258 | 2 | Consigned to Shield |
| 8 | Barrow Raiders | 7 | 0 | 0 | 7 | 82 | 272 | −190 | 0 | Consigned to Shield |

Source: Sky Sports
Rules for classification: 1) competition points 2) points difference (points scored minus points conceded) 3) points scored percentage (points scored divided by points conceded, multiplied by 100).

=== Super 4s ===
| Pos | Team | Pld | W | D | L | PF | PA | PD | Pts | Qualification (Note: should teams have the same points difference, then position is decided by points scored percentage (points scored, divided by points conceded, multiplied by 100).) |
|---|---|---|---|---|---|---|---|---|---|---|
| 1 | Wigan Warriors (L, Y) | 13 | 12 | 0 | 1 | 582 | 150 | +432 | 24 | League Leaders' Shield and advance to Grand Final |
| 2 | Leeds Rhinos | 13 | 8 | 0 | 5 | 442 | 220 | +222 | 16 | Advance to semi-final |
| 3 | York Valkyrie (C) | 13 | 7 | 0 | 6 | 306 | 228 | +78 | 14 | Advance to semi-final |
| 4 | St Helens | 13 | 7 | 0 | 6 | 332 | 300 | +32 | 14 | |

Source: Sky Sports
Rules for classification: 1) competition points 2) points difference (points scored minus points conceded) 3) points scored percentage (points scored divided by points conceded, multiplied by 100).
(C) Champions; (L) League Leaders' Shield Winners; (Y) Runners up

=== Shield ===
| Pos | Team | Pld | W | D | L | PF | PA | PD | Pts | Qualification or relegation (Note: should teams have the same points difference, then position is decided by points scored percentage (points scored, divided by points conceded, multiplied by 100).) |
|---|---|---|---|---|---|---|---|---|---|---|
| 5 | Huddersfield Giants | 13 | 8 | 0 | 5 | 376 | 254 | +122 | 16 | |
| 6 | Featherstone Rovers | 13 | 6 | 0 | 7 | 172 | 386 | −214 | 12 | |
| 7 | Barrow Raiders | 13 | 2 | 0 | 11 | 162 | 434 | −272 | 4 | |
| 8 | Leigh Leopards (R) | 13 | 2 | 0 | 11 | 96 | 482 | −386 | 4 | Promotion play-off |

Source: Sky Sports
Rules for classification: 1) competition points 2) points difference (points scored minus points conceded) 3) points scored percentage (points scored divided by points conceded, multiplied by 100).
Some sources indicated that the top two teams would qualify for a Shield Final, but no date was given for the match.
(R) Relegated

== Play-offs ==
The play-off semi-final was played on 18 September. The Grand Final was played on 27 September as a double-header with the promotion/relegation play-off.

=== Relegation playoff ===
27 September 2026
14:00 BST (UTC+01:00)

| Leigh Leopards | 6–36 | London Broncos |
|---|---|---|
| Tries: Johnson; Goals: Melvon (1/1) | 1st: 6–24; 2nd: 0–12 | Tries: Titcombe (4), Kennedy (2), Barber, Smart; Goals: Lewis (2/6) |

Brick Community Stadium, Wigan
Referee: J. Pemberton

=== Grand Final playoffs ===
==== Team bracket ====
| Semi-finals | | | Grand Final |
| | | | 1 | Wigan Warriors | 6 |
| 2 | Leeds Rhinos | 0 | 3 | York Valkyrie | 8 |
| 3 | York Valkyrie | 12 |

==== Semi-final ====
18 September 2026
17:15 BST (UTC+01:00)

| Leeds Rhinos | 0–12 | York Valkyrie |
|---|---|---|
| | 1st: 0–8; 2nd: 0–4 | Tries: O. Wood, Akwiwu; Goals: Stanley (2/3) |

Headingley Stadium
Referee: D. Arnold

==== Grand Final ====
27 September 2026
17:30 BST (UTC+01:00)

| Wigan Warriors | 6–8 | York Valkyrie |
|---|---|---|
| Tries: Atherton 19'; Goals: Rowe (1/1); Sin bin: Atherton (yellow card) 27'; Hunter (yellow card) 38' | 1st: 6–8; 2nd: 0–0 | Tries: Peach 9'; Goals: Williamson 10', 28' (pen.) |

Brick Community Stadium, Wigan
Referee: A. Moore
Player of the Match: Amelie Lenham

Team details
| Wigan Warriors | | Position | York Valkyrie |
| Name | Number | Position | Number | Name |
|---|---|---|---|---|
| Grace Banks | 1 | FB | 23 | Monique Donovan |
| Anna Davies | 2 | WG | 3 | Emma Kershaw |
| Georgia Wilson | 3 | CE | 21 | Petra Woods |
| Molly Jones | 4 | CE | 28 | Amalie Lenham |
| Ellise Derbyshire | 5 | WG | 2 | Eboni Partington |
| Jenna Foubister | 6 | SO | 25 | Adaoha Akwiwu |
| Isabel Rowe | 7 | SH | 7 | Ellie Williamson |
| Mary Coleman (substituted off) 31', (substituted on) 56' | 8 | PR | 16 | Agnes Wood |
| Remi Wilton (substituted off) 23', (substituted on) 62' | 19 | HK | 9 | Sinead Peach |
| Lucie Sams (substituted off) 18', (substituted on) 31', (substituted off) 56' | 20 | PF | 15 | Megan Pakulis |
| Eva Hunter (yellow card) 38' | 11 | SR | 25 | Olivia Wood |
| Cerys Jones | 12 | SR | 12 | Savannah Andrade |
| Megan Williams (substituted off) 18', (substituted on) 64' | 13 | LF | 24 | Lisa Parker |
| Carys Marsh (substituted on) 23', (substituted off) 62' | 9 | IN | 10 | Jasmine Bell |
| Mia-Jayne Atherton (substituted on) 18', 19', (yellow card) 27' | 10 | IN | 14 | Isabel Bibby |
| Bethan Dainton (substituted on) 18', (substituted off) 64' | 15 | IN | 18 | Isabelle Brennan |
| Beri Salihi (substituted on) 75' | 16 | IN | 19 | Brooke Henderson |
| Denis Betts | | Coach | | Leon Pryce |

== Player statistics ==
=== Top 5 try scorers ===
| Rank | Player (s) | Club | Tries |
|---|---|---|---|
| 1 | Amelia Brown | Huddersfield Giants | 26 |
| 2 | Eva Hunter | Wigan Warriors | 19 |
| 3 | Anna Davies | Wigan Warriors | 17 |
| 4 | Connie Boyd | Leeds Rhinos | 12 |
| 4 | Ebony Stead | Leeds Rhinos | 12 |
| 4 | Liv Whitehead | Leeds Rhinos | 12 |

=== Top 5 goal scorers ===
| Rank | Player (s) | Club | Goals |
|---|---|---|---|
| 1 | Isabel Rowe | Wigan Warriors | 55 |
| 2 | Mel Howard | Leeds Rhinos | 46 |
| 3 | Faye Gaskin | St Helens | 33 |
| 4 | Sam Hulme | Huddersfield Giants | 18 |
| 4 | Ellie Williamson | York Valkyrie | 18 |

=== Top 5 points scorers ===
| Rank | Player (s) | Club | Points |
|---|---|---|---|
| 1 | Isabel Rowe | Wigan Warriors | 126 |
| 2 | Mel Howard | Leeds Rhinos | 116 |
| 3 | Amelia Brown | Huddersfield Giants | 104 |
| 4 | Faye Gaskin | St Helens | 82 |
| 5 | Eva Hunter | Wigan Warriors | 76 |

(Regular season and play-offs)

== End of season awards ==
The RFL's 2026 Rugby League Awards Night took place on 29 September. The Women's Super League winners were:

Woman of Steel: Jenna Foubister (Wigan Warriors)
Young player of the year: Connie Boyd (Leeds Rhinos)
Coach of the year: Denis Betts (Wigan Warriors)
