= 2019 Rugby League World Cup 9s – Women's tournament =

The women's tournament in the 2019 Rugby League World Cup 9s was held at Bankwest Stadium in Sydney on 18 and 19 October 2019.

== Group stage ==
Pos	Team	Pld	W	D	L	PF	PA	PD	Pts	Qualification
1	Australia	3	3	0	0	94	18	+76	6	Advance to Final
2	New Zealand	3	2	0	1	65	38	+27	4	Advance to Final
3	England	3	1	0	2	33	79	−46	2	
4	Papua New Guinea	3	0	0	3	22	79	−57	0	

Updated to match(es) played on 18 October 2019. Source:

Friday, 18 October	England	25 – 4	Papua New Guinea	6:45pm
	Tries: Rhiannon Marshall (5' BP, 11') 2 Caitlin Beevers (8') 1 Emily Rudge (14') 1 Leah Burke (16') 1 Goals: Tara-Jane Stanley 2/4 (6', 16'); Faye Gaskin 0/1	1st: 11 – 4; 2nd: 14 – 0	Tries: 1 (9') Ua Ravu; Goals: 0/1 Roswita Kapo	Referee: Stephane Vincent (France)

Friday, 18 October	Australia	22 – 8	New Zealand	8:35pm
				Referee: Darian Furner (Australia)

Saturday, 19 October	New Zealand	24 – 12	Papua New Guinea	11:30am

Saturday, 19 October	Australia	42 – 4	England	2:35pm

Saturday, 19 October	Australia	30 – 6	Papua New Guinea	5:40pm

Saturday, 19 October	New Zealand	33 – 4	England	6:05pm

== Final ==
Saturday, 19 October	Australia	15 – 17	New Zealand	7:45pm
				Referee: Henry Perenara (New Zealand)

== See also ==
- 2019 Rugby League World Cup 9s – Men's tournament
