= Ellise Derbyshire =

English rugby league footballer

Personal information
- Born: 4 February 2005 (age 21) Wigan, Greater Manchester, England

Playing information
- Position: Wing
Club
Years	Team	Pld	T	G	FG	P
2023	Leigh Leopards	15	11	0	0	44
2024–	Wigan Warriors	36	29	0	0	116
	Total	51	40	0	0	160
- Source: As of 15 October 2025

Ellise Derbyshire (born 4 February 2005) is an English rugby league footballer who plays as a winger for Wigan Warriors in the Women's Super League.

== Club career ==
Derbyshire was born in Wigan, and started playing rugby league at her former school, Rose Bridge. She also played at Leigh Miners at junior level, and was a member of the Rugby Football League's diploma in sporting excellence (DiSE) programme in 2021–22.

=== 2023 ===
Derbyshire made her debut for Leigh Leopards against Bradford Bulls in round 1 of the 2023 season, in a 12–12 draw at Odsal Stadium.

On 23 April, in the first round of the Challenge Cup, Derbyshire scored her first try for Leigh in a 16–38 win over Hull Kingston Rovers at Craven Park.

Derbyshire played a total of 15 times throughout the season, scoring 11 tries as Leigh lost 14–8 in the Group 2 promotion final against Barrow Raiders at the York Community Stadium.

=== 2024 ===
In 2024, Derbyshire signed for Wigan Warriors in the Women's Super League.

She made her debut for Wigan in round 1 of the 2024 Women's Challenge Cup, scoring a hatrick in a 0–68 win over Salford Red Devils at the Salford Stadium.

Derbyshire appeared 20 times in the 2024 season, scoring six times in five appearances in the Challenge Cup, and seven times in 15 matches in the Super League.

=== 2025 ===
On 7 June, Derbyshire played for Wigan in the 2025 Women's Challenge Cup final, in a 42–6 victory over St Helens. Derbyshire scored 4 times in 5 appearances in the competition, as Wigan won their maiden title.

Derbyshire played a total of eleven times during the 2025 season, scoring 4 tries in 6 Super League appearances.

== Club statistics ==
Club	Season	Tier	App	T	G	DG	Pts
Leigh Leopards	2023	Super League	15	11	0	0	44
Leigh Leopards	Total		15	11	0	0	44
Wigan Warriors	2024	Super League	20	13	0	0	52
Wigan Warriors	2025	Super League	11	8	0	0	32
Wigan Warriors	2026	Super League	5	8	0	0	32
Wigan Warriors	Total		36	29	0	0	116
Career total			51	40	0	0	160

== Honours ==
=== Wigan Warriors ===
- Super League
  - League Leader's Shield (1): 2025
- Challenge Cup
  - Winners (1): 2025
- RFL Women's Nines
  - Winners (2): 2024, 2025
