= Woman of Steel =

Award in English rugby league

- Sport: Rugby league
- Competition: Women's Super League
- Country: England

History
- First award: 2018
- First winner: Georgia Roche (Castleford Tigers)
- Most recent: Jenna Foubister (Wigan Warriors)

The Woman of Steel (known as the Telegraph Woman of Steel for sponsorship reasons in 2019) is an award in English rugby league. It is awarded to the player of the year in the Women's Super League; the winner is determined by a poll of the players in the Women's Super League.

The award was inaugurated in 2018 and the winner will be announced as part of the Steve Prescott Man of Steel Awards in October each year.

== 2018 ==
The inaugural nominees were Lois Forsell of Leeds Rhinos Women, Georgia Roche and Tara-Jane Stanley, both of Castleford Tigers Women. The award was won by Georgia Roche. In Castleford's Challenge Cup semi-final against York City Knights Roche had scored four tries and been named player of the match. All three nominees scored tries in the final of the Challenge Cup in which Forsell had captained Leeds Rhinos to victory.

== 2019 ==
On 10 September 2019 the Rugby Football League announced that the 2019 award would be sponsored by The Daily Telegraph and be known as the Telegraph Woman of Steel. The nominees were Castleford's Kelsey Gentles, Emily Rudge of St Helens and Leeds Rhinos' Courtney Winfield-Hill. The award was won by Courtney Winfield-Hill. The nominees represented each of the top three teams in the Super League. Winfield-Hill had been named player of the match in the final of the Challenge Cup after scoring the winning try. The week after being named Woman of Steel, Winfield-Hill captained Leeds to victory in the Super League Grand Final.

== 2020 ==
No award as the Women's Super League season was cancelled due to the COVID-19 pandemic.

== 2021 ==
Five players were shortlisted for the award: Jodie Cunningham, Emily Rudge (both St Helens), Sinead Peach, Rhiannon Marshall (both York City Knights) and Fran Goldthorp (Leeds Rhinos). Jodie Cunningham was named as the winner of the award. In June, four of the contenders had featured in the Challenge Cup final in which St Helens had defeated York. Rudge captained the England team to victory over Wales in the mid-season international and was one of the try scorers along with Cunningham and Goldthorp, who was making her international debut. At the time the shortlist was announced the teams of all five players had qualified for the play-offs semi-finals.

== 2022 ==
Six players were shortlisted for the award: Georgia Roche (Leeds Rhinos), Amy Hardcastle and Jodie Cunningham (both St Helens), Hollie-Mae Dodd, Sinead Peach, and Tara-Jane Stanley, (all three from York City Knights). Tara-Jane Stanley was announced as the winner of the award. In May, Cunningham was one of the scorers as St Helens had defeated Leeds to retain the Challenge Cup. York won the Nine's tournament and claimed their first League Leaders' Shield. They lost to Leeds in the Grand Final. All of the players apart from Sinead Peach were selected for the England squad at the 2021 World Cup, though she returned to the national team in 2023. At the World Cup Stanley was named in the Women's Team of the Tournament.

== 2023 ==
The shortlist of six players was announced on 20 September 2023. The nominees were Keara Bennett (Leeds Rhinos), Jodie Cunningham, Shona Hoyle and Emily Rudge (all St Helens), together with Tara-Jane Stanley and Sinead Peach (both of York Valkyrie). In October 2023 Peach was named as the winner of the award. All six players were part of the England national team that faced France in April. In August, Hoyle was one of the try scorers as Cunningham captained St Helens to win a third successive Challenge Cup Final. Hookers Bennett and Peach faced each other in the Grand Final where a try and two goals from Stanley saw York win 16–6 over Leeds.

== 2024 ==
In September 2024, three players were announced as the nominees for the 2024 award: Faye Gaskin (St Helens), Georgie Hetherington (York Valkyrie) and Lucy Murray (Leeds Rhinos). The award went to Georgie Hetherington who, in the absence of 2023 winner Sinead Peach, took over as hooker at York Valkyrie. In June, Hetherington scored on her England début against France and was the player of the match in the Super League Grand Final as York retained the title. Gaskin saw success with St Helens in 2024 as they took the League Leaders' Shield and retained the Challenge Cup, and Murray was named by Leeds Rhinos as the club's women's player of the year.

== 2025 ==
The short list for the 2025 award was a clean sweep for Wigan Warriors with Jenna Foubister, Eva Hunter and Isabel Rowe the nominees. The award went to second-row forward Hunter. Wigan won the treble in 2025 and Hunter, who scored in 13 consecutive matches, was joint top try scorer in the Super League with 20 tries. Rowe was named as the Young Player of the Year.

== 2026 ==
The shortlist for the 2026 award featured three nominees from Wigan Warriors: Jenna Foubister, Eva Hunter and Megan Williams. Wigan had retained the Challenge Cup and League Leaders' Shield, but missed out on back-to-back trebles after losing to York Valkyrie in the Grand Final. On 29 September, half-back Jenna Foubister was announced as the winner of the award. The previous day, all three nominees had been named in the England squad for the 2026 World Cup.

== Winners ==
Year	Winner	Club	Ref.
2018	Georgia Roche	Castleford Tigers	
2019	Courtney Hill	Leeds Rhinos	
2020	No award		
2021	Jodie Cunningham	St. Helens	
2022	Tara-Jane Stanley	York City Knights	
2023	Sinead Peach	York Valkyrie	
2024	Georgie Hetherington	York Valkyrie	
2025	Eva Hunter	Wigan Warriors	
2026	Jenna Foubister	Wigan Warriors	

=== Winners by club ===
	Club	Wins
1	York Valkyrie	3
2	Wigan Warriors	2
3	Castleford Tigers	1
3	Leeds Rhinos	1
3	St Helens	1

== See also ==
- List of sports awards honoring women
