= 2019 Rugby League World Cup 9s – Men's tournament =

The men's tournament in the 2019 Rugby League World Cup 9s was held at Bankwest Stadium in Sydney on 18 and 19 October 2019.

== Group stage ==
=== Pool A ===
Pos	Team	Pld	W	D	L	PF	PA	PD	Pts	Qualification
1	Australia	3	3	0	0	92	23	+69	6	Advance to knockout stages
2	New Zealand	3	2	0	1	76	42	+34	4	Advance to knockout stages
3	Papua New Guinea	3	1	0	2	44	54	−10	2	
4	United States	3	0	0	3	21	114	−93	0	

Friday, 18 October	Australia	25 – 12	New Zealand	9:00pm
				Referee: (Australia) Gerard Sutton

Friday, 18 October	Papua New Guinea	27 – 10	United States	9:25pm
				Referee: Ziggy Adamski

Saturday, 19 October	New Zealand	18 – 17	Papua New Guinea	1:45pm

Saturday, 19 October	Australia	41 – 11	United States	2:10pm

Saturday, 19 October	New Zealand	46 – 0	United States	4:50pm

Saturday, 19 October	Australia	26 – 0	Papua New Guinea	5:15pm

=== Pool B ===
Pos	Team	Pld	W	D	L	PF	PA	PD	Pts	Qualification
1	England	3	2	0	1	76	24	+52	4	Advance to knockout stages
2	Lebanon	3	2	0	1	42	46	−4	4	
3	France	3	1	0	2	35	56	−21	2	
4	Wales	3	1	0	2	35	62	−27	2	

Friday, 18 October	France	8 – 12	Lebanon	6:20pm
	Tries: Paul Marcon (12') 1 Gavin Marguerite (15') 1 Goals: Louis Jouffret 0/1; Arthur Morgues 0/1	1st: 0 – 12; 2nd: 8 – 0	Tries: 2 (5', 7') Bilal Marbani; Goals: 2/2 Jayden El-Jalkh (6', 8')	Referee: Matt Cecchin (Australia)

Friday, 18 October	England	25 – 4	Wales	7:10pm
	Tries: Jake Connor (10', 13') 2 Daryl Clark (2') 1 Sam Tomkins (4' BP) 1 Jermaine McGillvary (6') 1 Goals: Gareth Widdop 2/2 (2', 5'); Blake Austin 0/2; Sam Tomkins 0/1	1st: 17 – 0; 2nd: 8 – 4	Tries: 1 (17') Mike Butt; Goals: 0/1 Rhodri Lloyd	Referee: Ben Cummins (Australia)

Saturday, 19 October	France	23 – 6	Wales	11:55am

Saturday, 19 October	England	13 – 16	Lebanon	12:20pm

Saturday, 19 October	Lebanon	14 – 25	Wales	3:00pm

Saturday, 19 October	England	38 – 4	France	3:25pm

=== Pool C ===
Pos	Team	Pld	W	D	L	PF	PA	PD	Pts	Qualification
1	Samoa	3	3	0	0	73	41	+32	6	Advance to knockout stages
2	Cook Islands	3	2	0	1	46	34	+12	4	
3	Tonga Invitational	3	1	0	2	48	71	−23	2	
4	Fiji	3	0	0	3	44	65	−21	0	

Friday, 18 October	Tonga Invitational	7 – 30	Cook Islands	7:35pm
				Referee: Jon Stone

Friday, 18 October	Samoa	32 – 17	Fiji	8:10pm
				Referee: Grant Atkins

Saturday, 19 October	Samoa	17 – 4	Cook Islands	12:45pm

Saturday, 19 October	Tonga Invitational	21 – 17	Fiji	1:10pm

Saturday, 19 October	Fiji	10 – 12	Cook Islands	4:00pm

Saturday, 19 October	Tonga Invitational	20 – 24	Samoa	4:25pm

== Knockout stage ==
Semi-finals
A1	Australia	25
C1	Samoa	8
A2	New Zealand	22
B1	England	6

Final
Australia	24
New Zealand	10

=== Semi-finals ===
Saturday, 19 October	New Zealand	22 – 6	England	6:55pm
				Referee: Ben Cummins (Australia)

Saturday, 19 October	Australia	25 – 8	Samoa	7:20pm
				Referee: Chris Kendall (England)

=== Final ===
Saturday, 19 October	Australia	24 – 10	New Zealand	9:00pm
				Referee: Chris Kendall (England)

== See also ==
- 2019 Rugby League World Cup 9s – Women's tournament
