= Rob Burrow =

English rugby league footballer (1982–2024)

Rob Burrow CBE
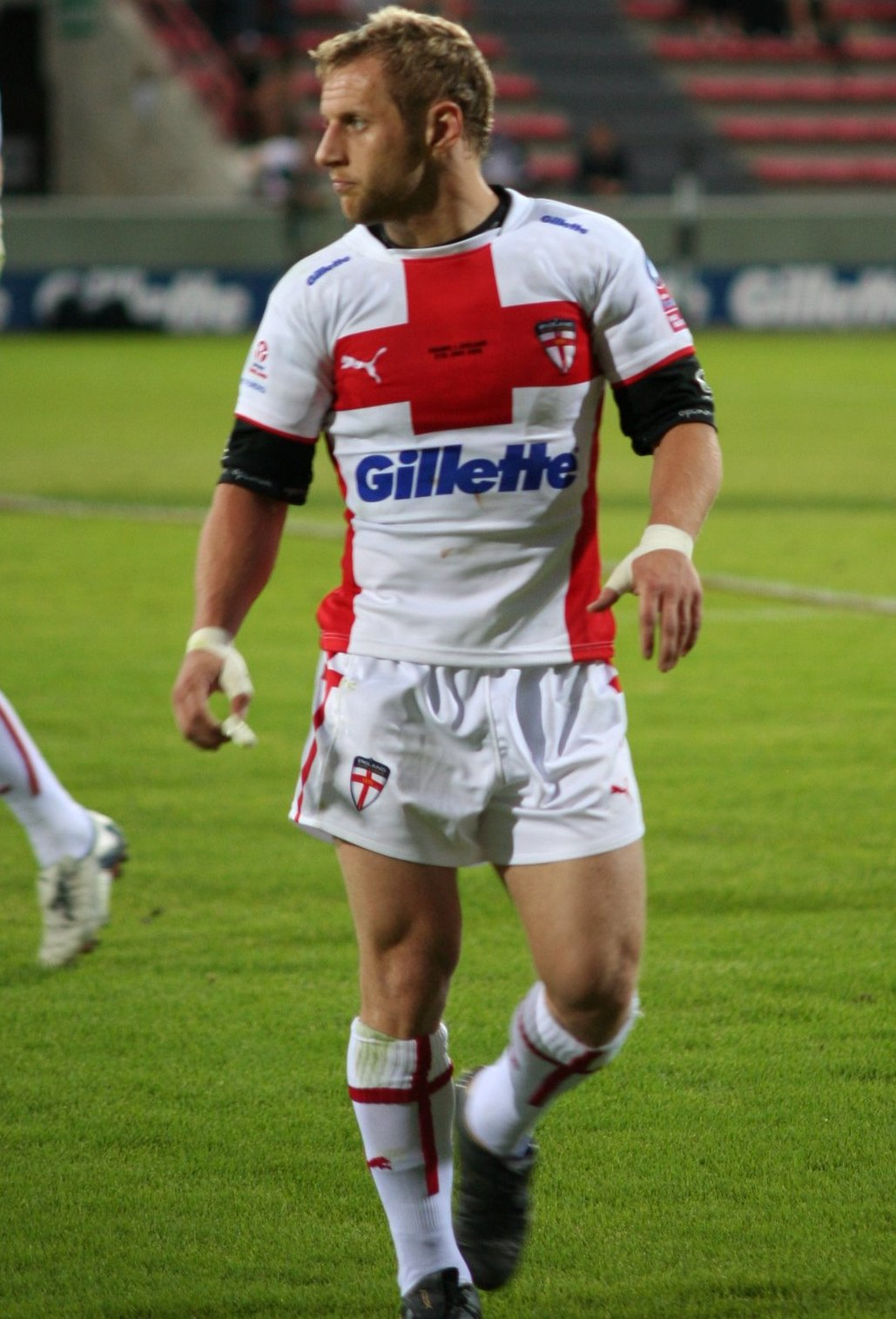
- Burrow with England in 2008

Personal information
- Full name: Robert Geoffrey Burrow
- Born: 26 September 1982 Pontefract, West Yorkshire, England
- Died: 2 June 2024 (aged 41) Wakefield, West Yorkshire, England

Playing information
- Height: 5 ft 5 in (165 cm)
- Weight: 10 st 6 lb (66 kg)
- Position: Scrum-half, Hooker
Club
Years	Team	Pld	T	G	FG	P
2001–17	Leeds Rhinos	492	196	157	5	1103
Representative
Years	Team	Pld	T	G	FG	P
2002–03	Yorkshire	2	0	1	0	2
2004–13	England	13	9	12	0	60
2005–07	Great Britain	5	4	9	0	34

Robert Geoffrey Burrow CBE (26 September 1982 – 2 June 2024) was an English professional rugby league footballer who played as a scrum-half or hooker. Burrow spent his entire professional career with the Leeds Rhinos, making nearly 500 appearances as well as representing Great Britain, England, and Yorkshire.

At 5 ft 5 in (165 cm) tall and weighing 66 kg (146 lb), Burrow was known for many years as "the smallest player in Super League". Despite this, he was one of the most successful players in the competition's history, winning eight Super League championships, two Challenge Cups, being named to the Super League Dream Team on three occasions and winning the Harry Sunderland Trophy twice.

In December 2019, Burrow was diagnosed with motor neurone disease (MND). Following his diagnosis, Burrow raised awareness for MND with fellow player Kevin Sinfield. Both were awarded CBEs in 2024 because of their efforts in raising funds and awareness of the disease. He died from MND on 2 June 2024, aged 41.

== Early life ==
Robert Geoffrey Burrow was born in Pontefract, West Yorkshire on 26 September 1982. He was the son of Irene (née Bateman) and Geoffrey (died 2026) , a branch secretary for the GMB trade union, and had two older sisters. He grew up in Castleford, and was educated at Airedale High School. He began playing rugby league at the age of seven for Castleford Panthers, and later played at junior level with Featherstone Lions.

== Club career ==
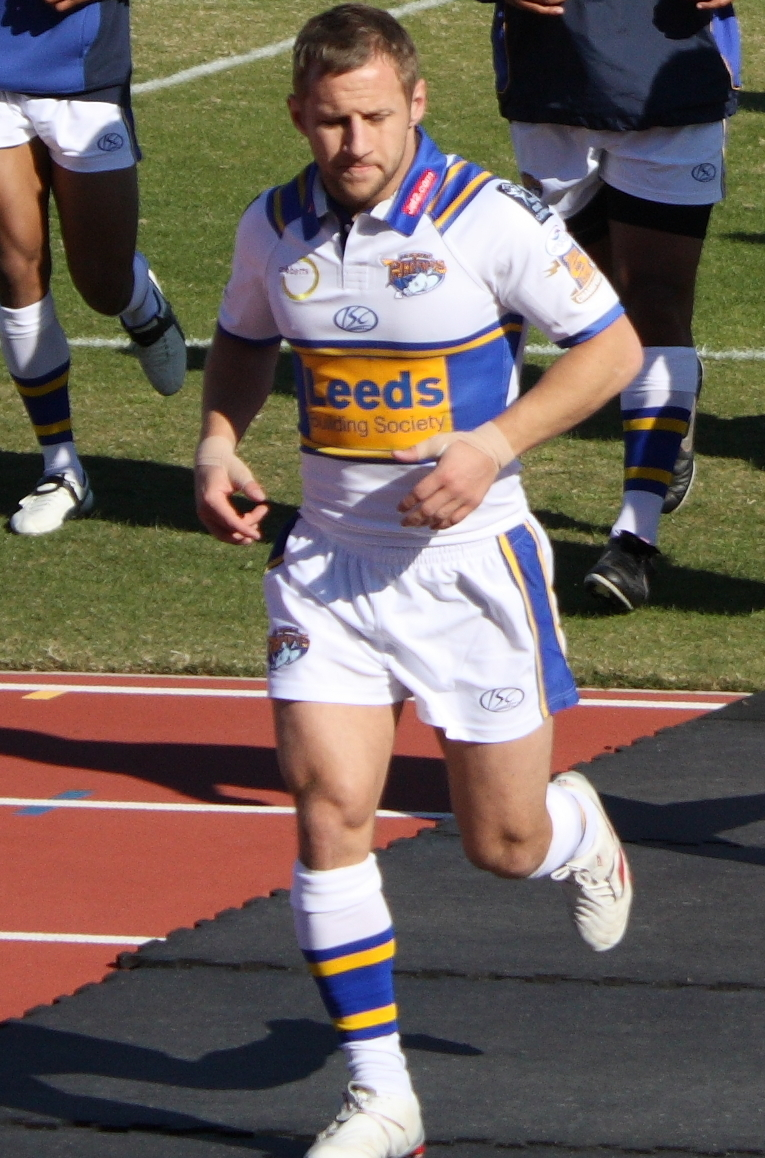
Burrow with the Leeds Rhinos in 2009

Burrow joined Leeds Rhinos in 1999, and spent the next couple of years in the academy ranks. He made his first team debut for Leeds in April 2001, appearing as a substitute in a defeat against Hull. He made his first start for the club a week later, scoring a try in a 6–36 defeat against Warrington Wolves. Burrow received further first team opportunities later in the season after Leeds first-choice scrum-half, Ryan Sheridan, was injured and had a number of impressive performances, most notably scoring two tries in a 23–18 win against reigning champions St Helens. He was named the Super League Young Player of the Year at the end of the season.

Burrow played in his first final during the 2003 season, appearing as a substitute in the 2003 Challenge Cup final against Bradford Bulls at the Millennium Stadium, but suffered a concussion in the first half, and took no further part in the game as Leeds lost the match 20–22.

Burrow played for the Leeds Rhinos from the interchange bench in their 2004 Super League Grand Final victory against the Bradford Bulls. As Super League IX champions, the Rhinos faced 2004 NRL season premiers, Canterbury-Bankstown Bulldogs in the 2005 World Club Challenge; Burrow played from the interchange bench, scoring a try in Leeds' 39–32 victory. He played for Leeds in the 2005 Challenge Cup Final at scrum half back in their loss against Hull FC. Later that year he played for the Leeds Rhinos at stand-off half back in their 2005 Super League Grand Final loss against Bradford Bulls. He was named in the Super League Dream Team for 2005.

Burrow was named as Leeds Rhinos Player of the Year for his performance throughout the 2007 season, and was named in the Super League Dream Team for the same year along with teammates Scott Donald, Jamie Peacock and Gareth Ellis. He was the winner of the Harry Sunderland Award for a man of the match performance in 2007's Super League XII Grand Final, in which Leeds defeated St. Helens by 33 points to 6.

Burrow was named in the Super League Dream Team for 2008's Super League XIII season. He played in the 2008 Super League Grand Final victory over St. Helens.

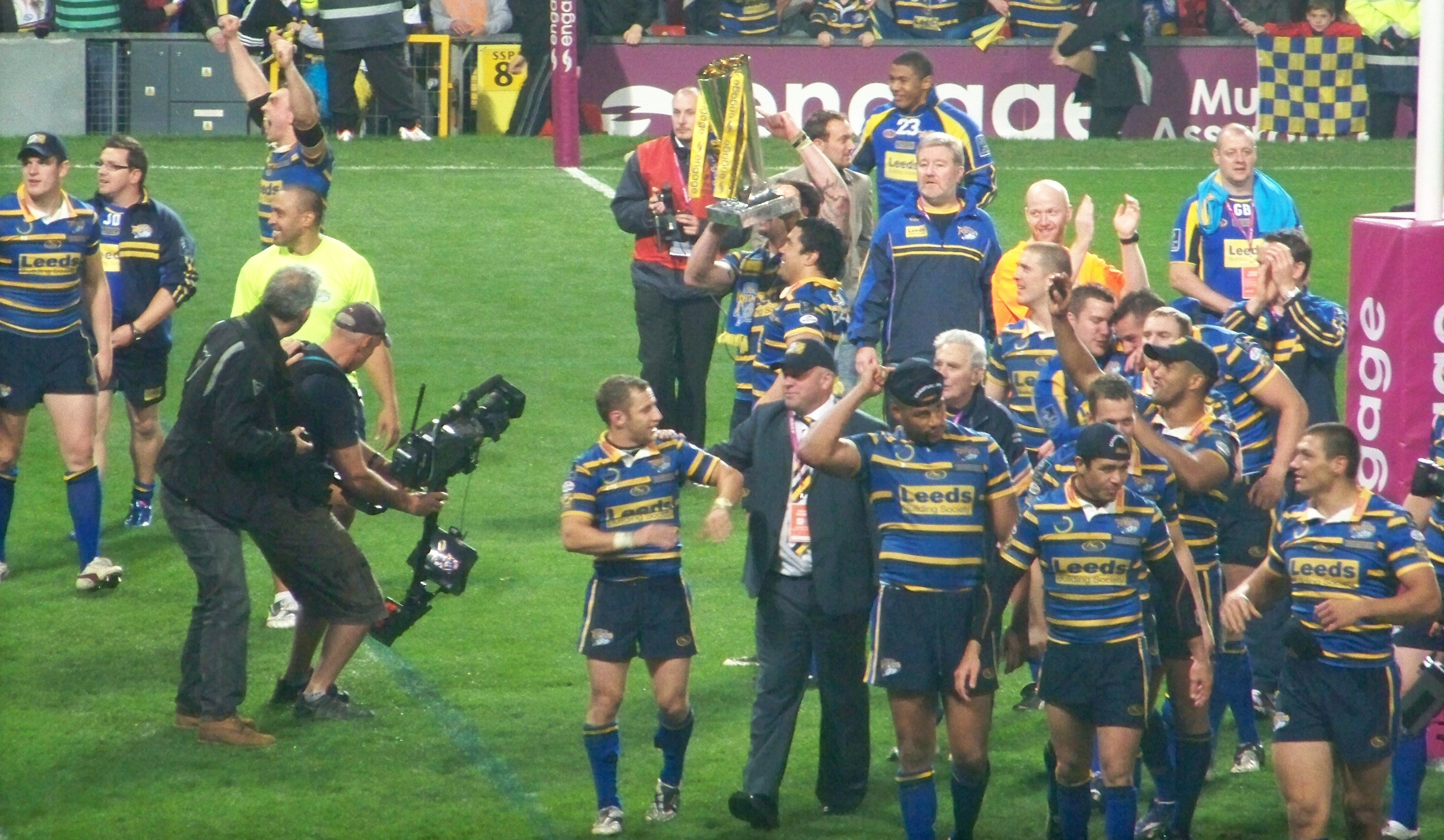
Burrow and his teammates celebrating their 2009 Super League Grand Final victory.

Burrow played in the 2009 Super League Grand Final victory over St. Helens at Old Trafford.

Burrow played in five Challenge Cup Finals in six years between 2010 and 2015. Leeds Rhinos lost three consecutive finals in 2010, 2011, and 2012. The team then won successive finals in 2014 and 2015.

Burrow played in the 32–16 victory over St Helens in the 2011 Super League Grand Final. His first-half try, a 50-metre solo effort, was regarded as one of the greatest tries in Grand Final history. He won the Harry Sunderland Award for the second time, when he was unanimously voted as man of the match. He also played in the 2012 Super League Grand Final victory over the Warrington Wolves, and the 2015 Super League Grand Final victory over the Wigan Warriors.

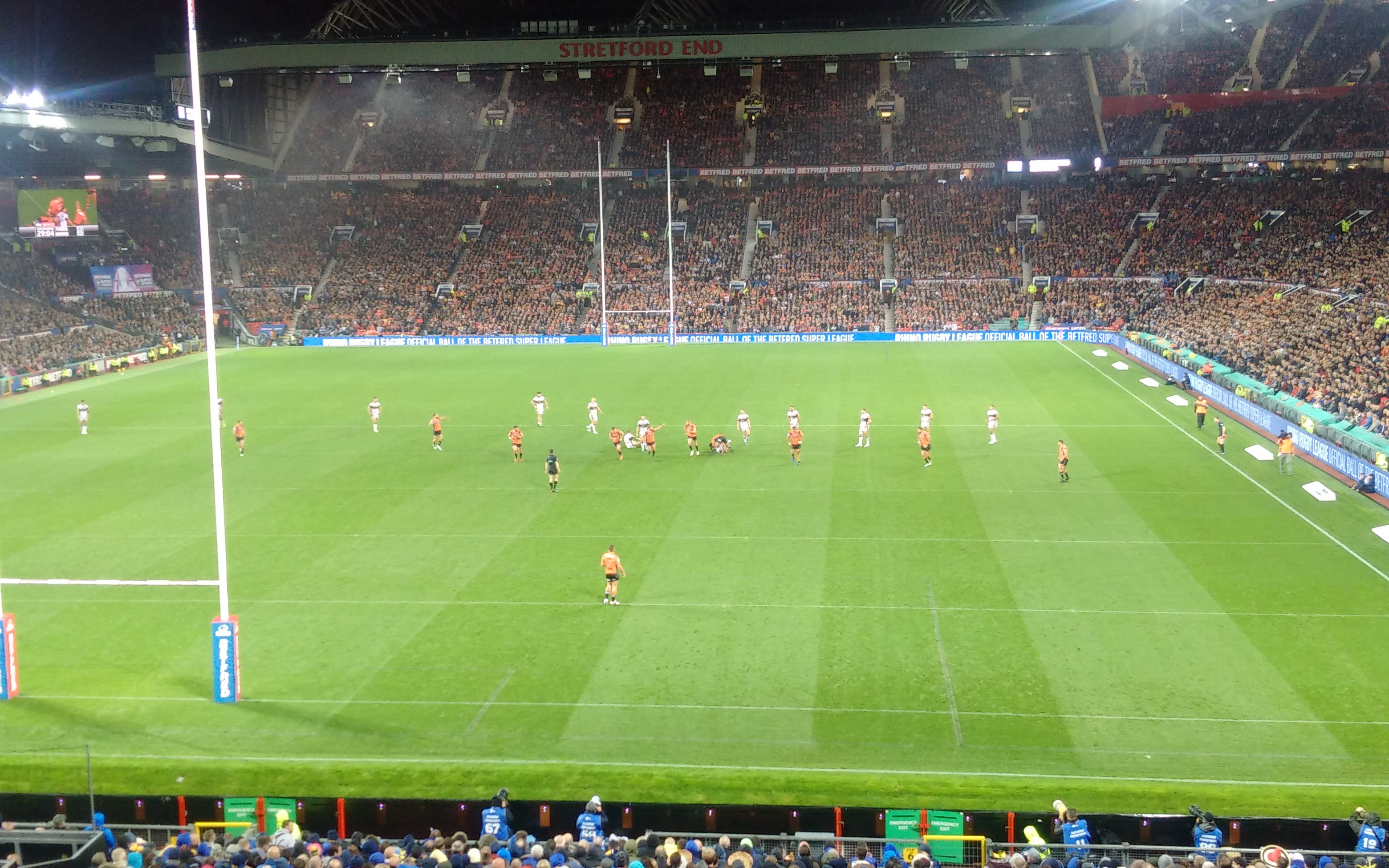
Burrow's final match was the 2017 Super League Grand Final in which he won his final trophy with Leeds.

Burrow announced his retirement in 2017. His final match was the 2017 Super League Grand Final in which he helped his club to victory over the Castleford Tigers at Old Trafford.

=== One-match return ===
On 12 January 2020, one month after his motor neurone disease diagnosis, Burrow came out of retirement to play for Leeds in a pre-season game against Bradford Bulls. The match was originally planned as a testimonial match for Jamie Jones-Buchanan who retired after the 2019 season, but was rebranded to "Jamie Jones-Buchanan testimonial and Rob Burrow support match", with a portion of the revenue going to MND support charities. The match was played by the Leeds first team, but saw a number of Jones-Buchanan's and Burrow's former teammates also come out of retirement for the match. Burrow came on as an interchange with five minutes left to play. Leeds won the match 34–10.

== International career ==
Burrow made his debut for Great Britain in the team's opening match of the 2005 Tri-Nations against New Zealand.

He was named in the squad for the 2006 Tri-Nations, but did not make any appearances.

In June 2007, Burrow was called up to the Great Britain squad for the test match against France. He played a pivotal role in helping Great Britain to a 3–0 victory over New Zealand in the Gillette Fusion Test series in 2007. He was awarded the George Smith Medal as player of the series which he finished as top points scorer with 26 from two tries and nine goals.

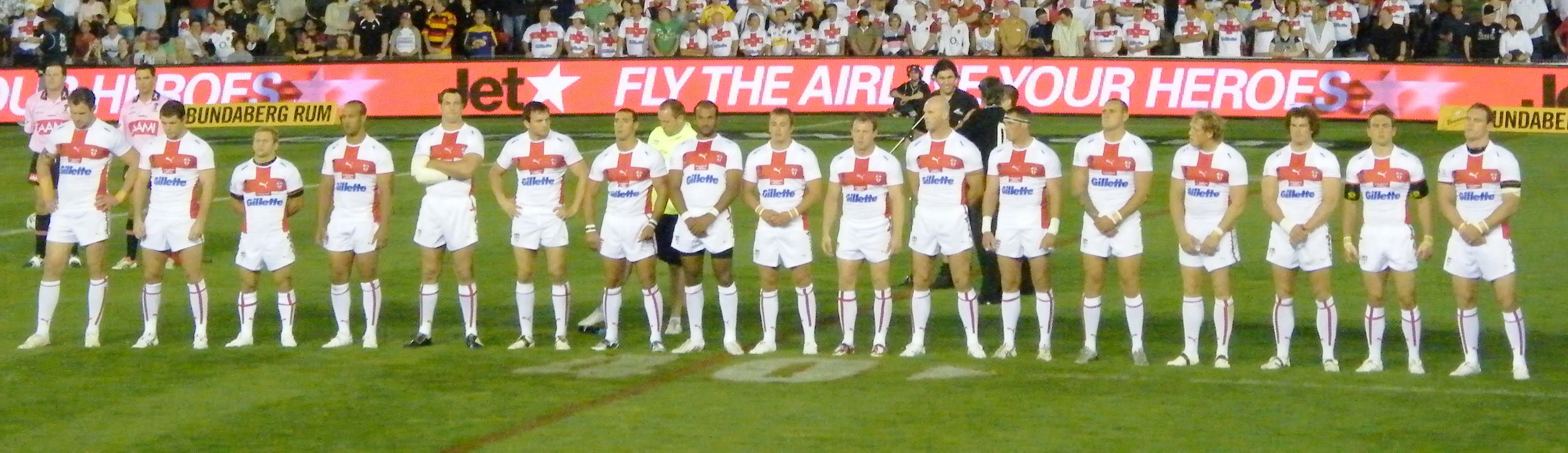
Burrow (third from the left) was noticeably smaller than his England teammates

Burrow was selected for the England squad to compete in the 2008 Rugby League World Cup tournament in Australia. In the first Group A match against Papua New Guinea, he played at scrum half back, with England winning the game.

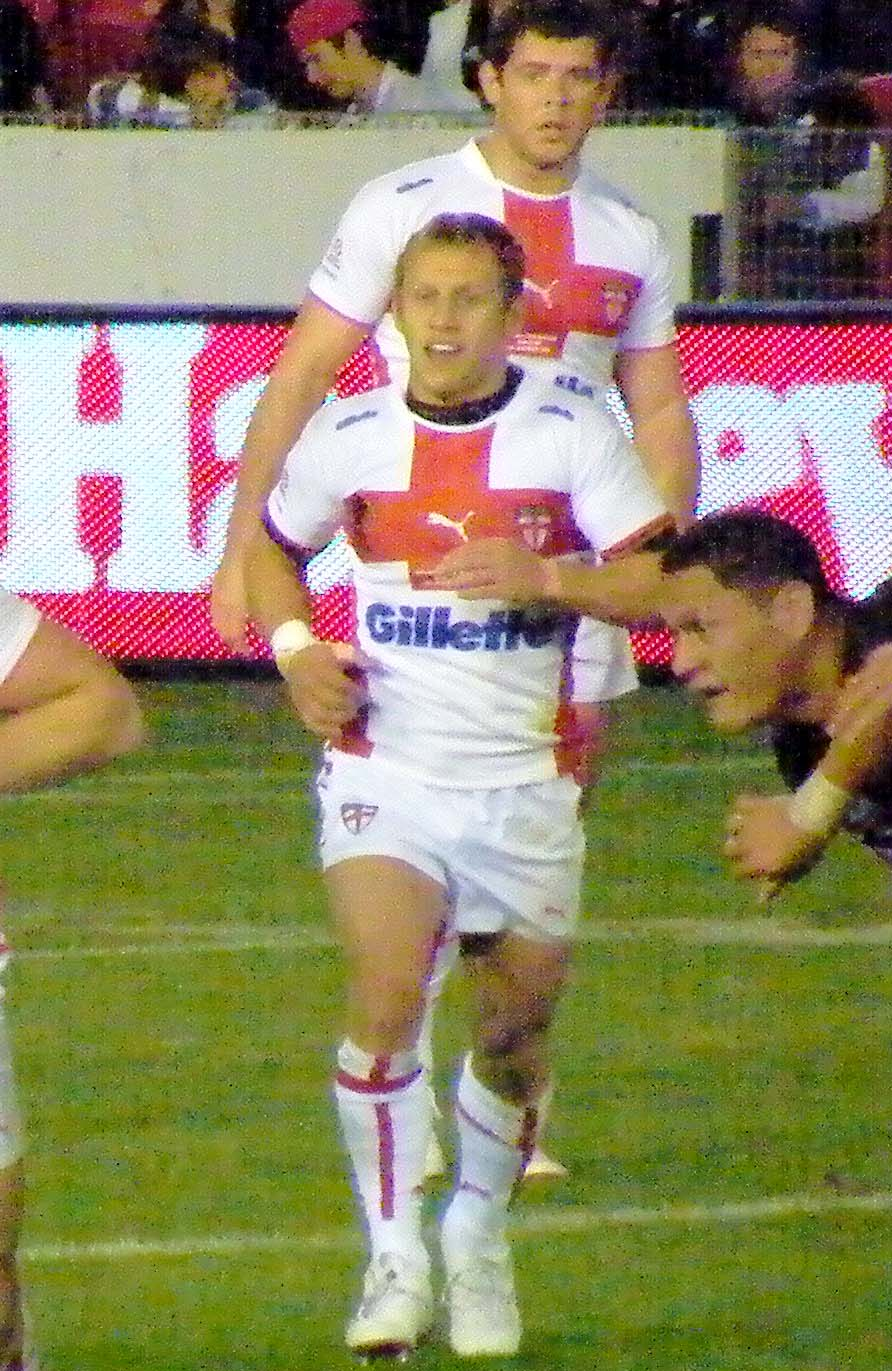
Burrow playing for England at the 2008 RLWC

He was not selected for England's 2011 Four Nations campaign due to a rib injury.

Burrow's final tournament for England was the 2013 World Cup, in which he scored one try in the final group game against Fiji.

== Playing style ==
At 5 ft 5 in tall, Burrow was the smallest player in the Super League for many years during his career. According to a teammate, his agility and quickness were phenomenal, which along with his low center of gravity, made him very difficult to defend. He was often compared to other diminutive half-backs such as Roger Millward and Allan Langer.

== Personal life ==
Burrow married his wife Lindsey in 2006. They met when they were both 15 and together have three children, two daughters, Macy and Maya, and a son, Jackson. His autobiography Too Many Reasons to Live was published in 2021, and won the Autobiography of the Year at the 2022 Sports Book Awards. He was a fan of the American NFL football team the Seattle Seahawks. In June 2024, Burrow’s wife Lindsey revealed that he had recorded a series of messages to be played for his children at special moments in their lives as they grow up.

== Illness and death ==
On 19 December 2019, Burrow revealed that he had been diagnosed with motor neurone disease (MND).

Burrow died at Pinderfields Hospital from complications of motor neurone disease, on 2 June 2024, aged 41.

=== Tributes ===
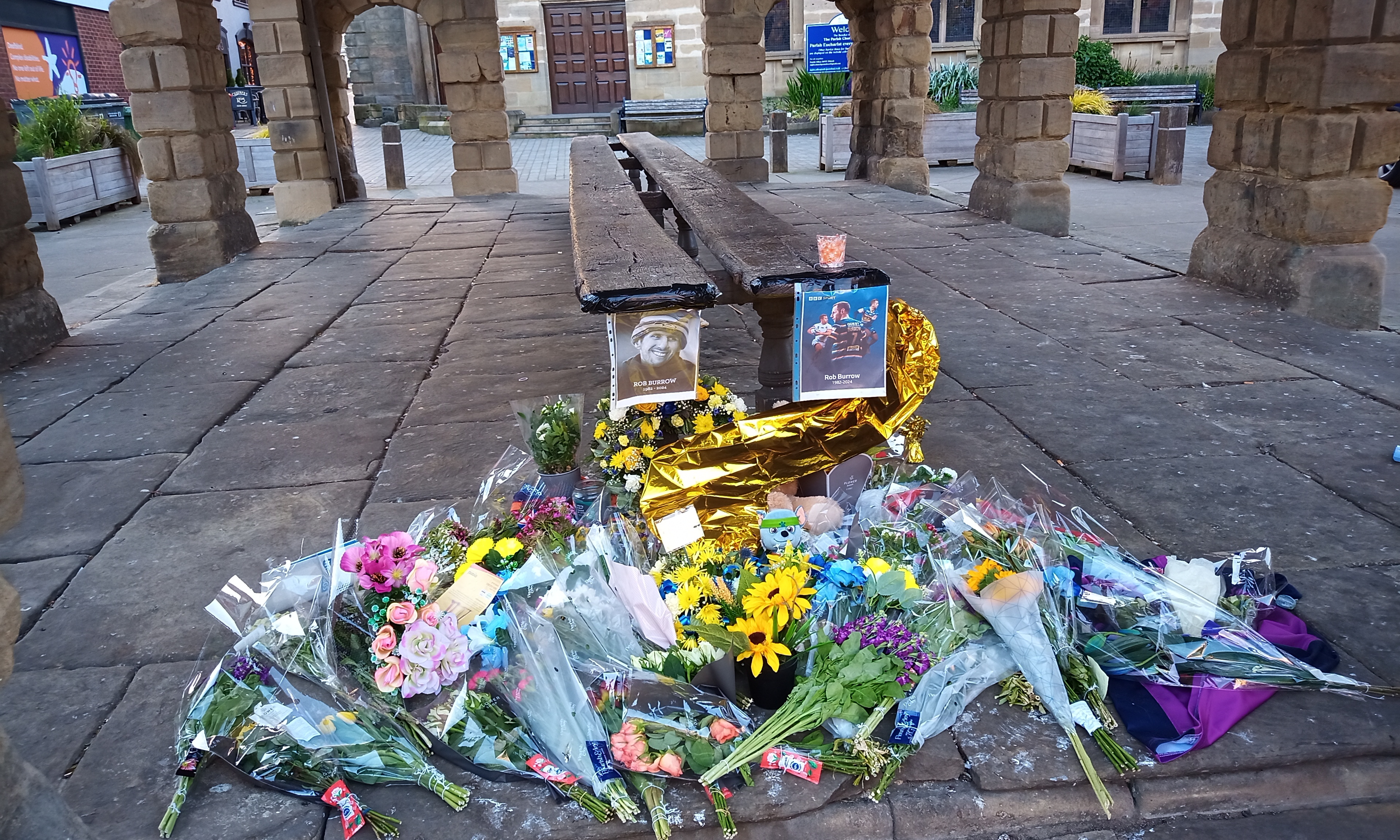
Memorial to Rob Burrow in his home town of Pontefract.

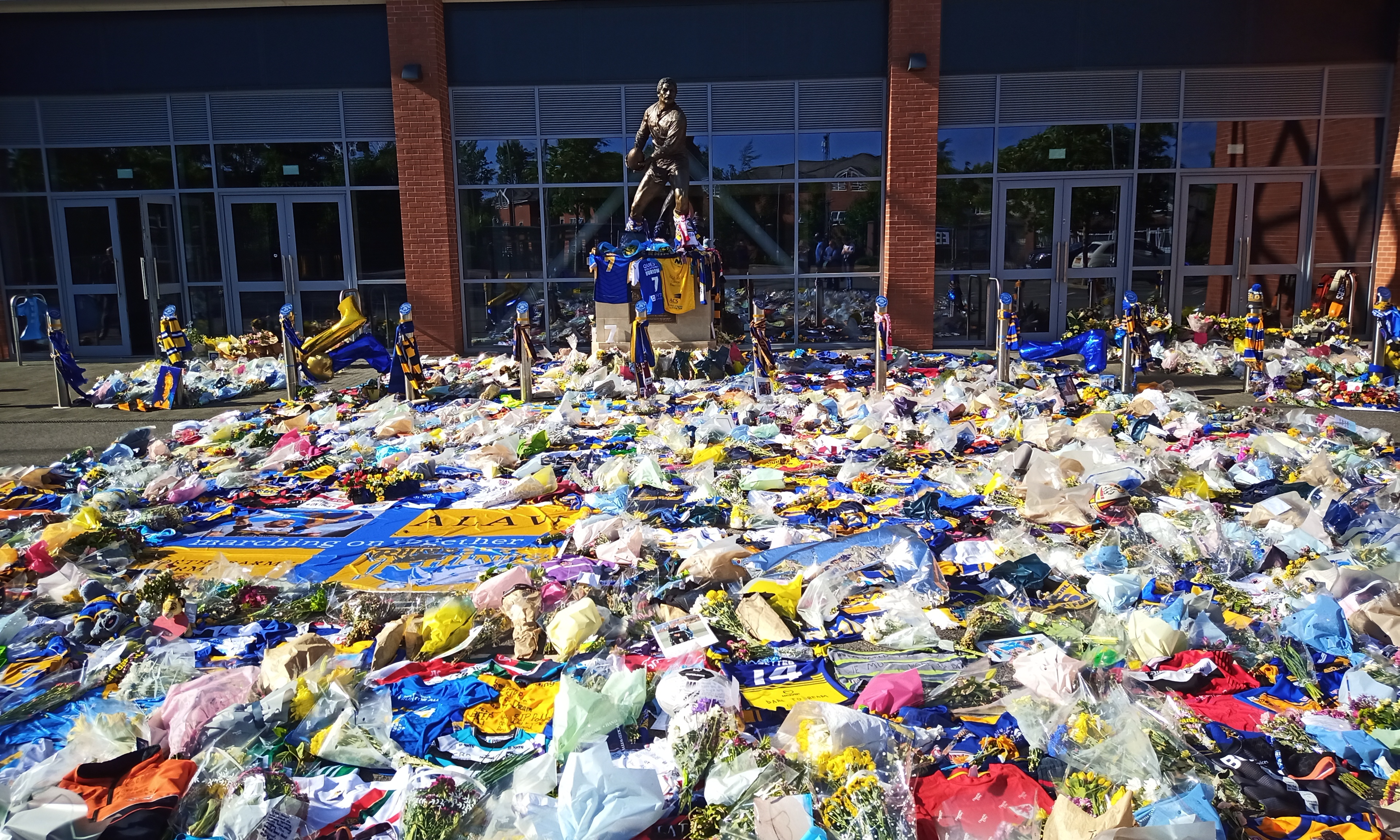
Memorial to Rob Burrow by the John Holmes statue at Headingley Stadium.

On 3 June, a minute's silence was held for Burrow at St James' Park ahead of the England national football team's UEFA Euro 2024 warm up fixture against Bosnia and Herzegovina.

During the 2024 Cup Finals Day at Wembley Stadium on 8 June (featuring the 2024 Challenge Cup final, 2024 Women's Challenge Cup final, and 2024 1895 Cup final), a memorial for Burrow was created at the rugby league statue. A minute's silence was held ahead of each match with a minute's applause carried out in the 7th minute of each game.

On 21 June, Leeds Rhinos's first home game following Burrow's death, a similar memorial was created at the John Holmes statue with a video celebrating his life being played in the stadium before kick-off.

Burrow's funeral was held at 1pm on 7 July 2024. A specialised route was put in place for the rugby league community to pay their respects. The cortege drove past Featherstone Lions ARLFC, Burrow's childhood club, before heading towards Pontefract Crematorium for a private ceremony. Kevin Sinfield, along with 160 guests including Rob's family all paid respects at his funeral.

On 26 July 2024, an episode of Coronation Street was dedicated to Burrow. The episode consisted of the character Paul Foreman (Peter Ash) struggling with MND. At the end of the episode a picture of Burrow at the Rovers Return was shown with a message below stating "Friend and Advisor of Coronation Street".

A year on from his death, Burrow's former school, Airedale Academy, opened its new gym, naming it the "Rob Burrow Fitness Suite".

== Legacy ==
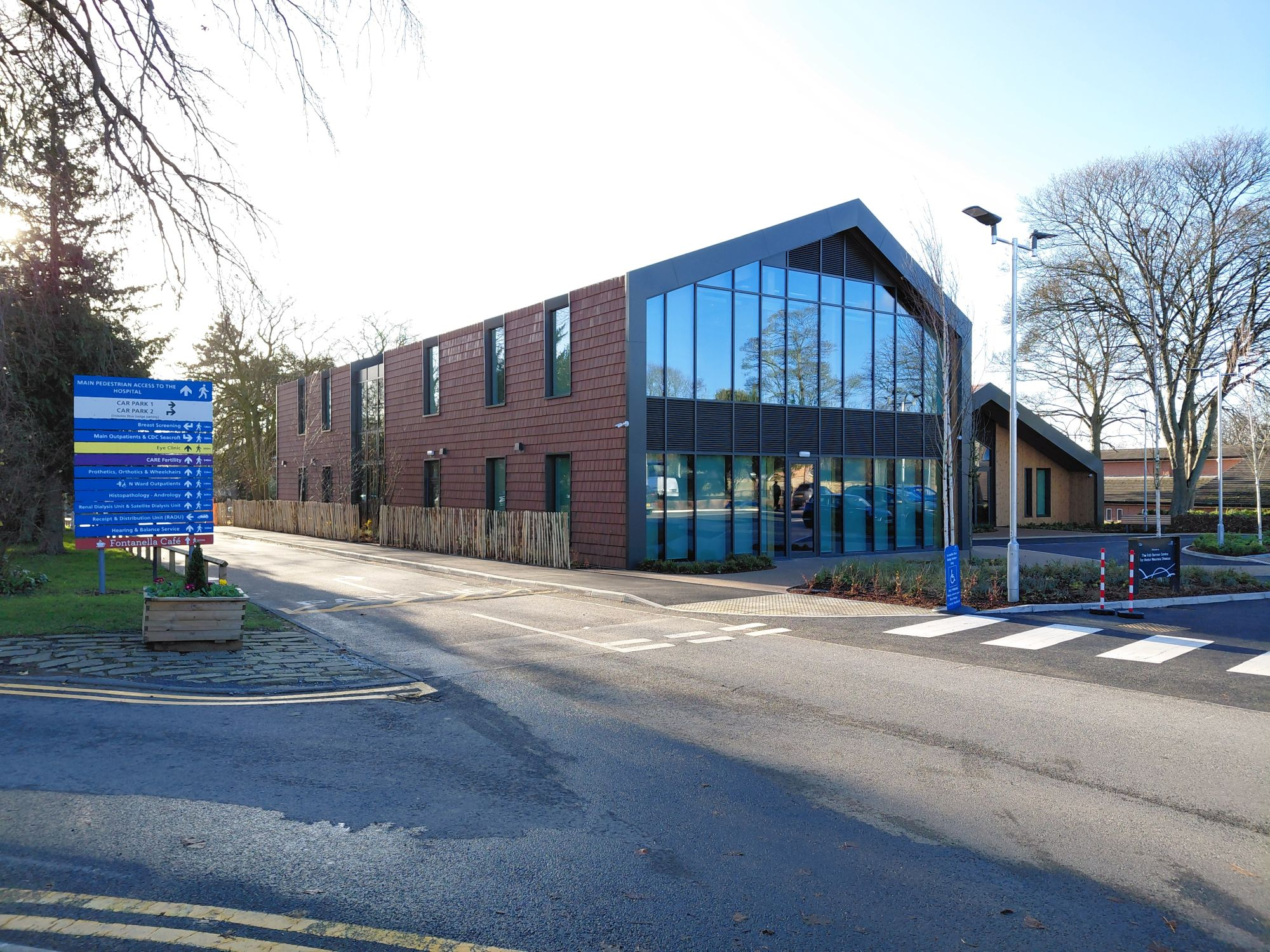
The Rob Burrow Centre for Motor Neurone Disease at Seacroft Hospital

In September 2021, an appeal was launched to build a care centre for MND patients in the Leeds area, which would be named the Rob Burrow Centre for Motor Neurone Disease. To raise money for the facility, the annual Leeds Half Marathon was paired with a full marathon named the Rob Burrow Leeds Marathon. Since 2023, both marathons are run on the second Sunday in May.

In 2023 the BBC documentary Rob Burrow: Living with MND won documentary of the year at the 28th National Television Awards.

In February 2024 the RFL announced that an award for the Super League Grand Final player of the match would be introduced, replacing the Harry Sunderland Trophy, and will be called the Rob Burrow Award.

Burrow was appointed Member of the Order of the British Empire (MBE) in the 2021 New Year Honours for services to rugby league and the motor neurone disease community and promoted to Commander of the Order of the British Empire (CBE) in the 2024 New Year Honours for services to motor neurone disease awareness.

At the time of his death, Burrow had raised over £6 million for motor neurone disease awareness and treatment charities. The day following his death, work began on The Rob Burrow Centre: 3 June was a pre-scheduled date. Burrow had a hand in the design and creation of the facility. The centre opened in November 2025.

In September 2025, Northern Trains unveiled a named Class 195 train, 195107 Rob Burrow CBE, in a publicised ceremony.

== Honours ==
Club

- Super League (8): 2004, 2007, 2008, 2009, 2011, 2012, 2015, 2017
- League Leader's Shield (3): 2004, 2009, 2015
- Challenge Cup (2): 2014, 2015
- World Club Challenge (3): 2005, 2008, 2012

Individual

- Young Player of the Year: 2001
- Harry Sunderland Trophy: 2007, 2011
- Super League Dream Team: 2005, 2007, 2008
- Leeds Rhinos Hall of Fame: 2020

Orders and special awards

- Member of the Order of the British Empire: 2021 New Year Honours – For services to Rugby League and to Motor Neurone Disease Awareness
- Commander of the Order of the British Empire: 2024 New Year Honours – For services to Motor Neurone Disease Awareness
- Honorary degree of Doctor of Sport Science from Leeds Beckett University
- BBC Sports Personality of the Year Helen Rollason Award, 2022
