= Courtney Winfield-Hill =

Australian sportswoman

Personal information
- Born: 9 January 1987 (age 39); Maryborough, Queensland, Australia
- Bowling: Right-arm medium
- Role: Bowler
- Relatives: Lauren Winfield-Hill (wife)

Domestic team information
- Years: Team
- 2009–2014: Queensland Fire (squad no. 22)
- 2015–2017: Brisbane Heat (squad no. 22)
- Source: ESPNcricinfo, 13 March 2017
- Rugby league career

Playing information
- Height: 167 cm (5 ft 6 in)
- Weight: 56 kg (8 st 11 lb)
- Position: Scrum-half
Club
Years	Team	Pld	T	G	FG	P
2018–22	Leeds Rhinos	44	29	145	0	406
Representative
Years	Team	Pld	T	G	FG	P
2022	England	5	3	0	0	12

Courtney Winfield-Hill (née Hill; born 9 January 1987) is an Australian-born sportswoman who formerly played rugby league for England and Leeds Rhinos. Originally Winfield-Hill played cricket as a pace bowler for Queensland Fire and Brisbane Heat, before moving sports and countries to play rugby league.

== Career ==
Nicknamed "Corker" because her younger sister had difficulty pronouncing her name as a toddler, Winfield-Hill was born in Maryborough, Queensland. She was raised in Monto, Queensland, and in Rockhampton, where she also learned to play cricket. In November 2009, Winfield-Hill made her debut for Queensland Fire. In 2011, she moved to the Sunshine Coast to pursue a career in professional cricket.

Injury prevented Winfield-Hill from having much of an impact on the 2011–12 Women's National Cricket League season. The following summer, she had limited opportunities due to competition from other pace bowlers, but still played five of the eight WNCL matches and nine of the 12 T20s. In 2013–14, she enjoyed more success, taking wickets in both series at averages of 29.33 and 18.42 respectively.

Winfield-Hill was a member of the Brisbane Heat squad since its inaugural WBBL01 season (2015–16).

A schoolteacher by profession, Winfield-Hill worked at St Ursula's College, Yeppoon, while living in Rockhampton, and as of 2015 was the Year 10 co-ordinator at Unity College, Caloundra. In 2014, she took up professional sprinting, and, in her debut performance, won the 100m Ladies Gift at the 33rd annual Ipswich Winter Carnival. In 2015, she competed in Australia's premiere handicap sprint, the Stawell Gift.

In April 2018 she made the decision to join her then partner (now wife), Lauren Winfield, in England and on arrival took the decision to change sports to rugby league - a game she had not played since junior level. Despite this lack of experience she was given a contract by Leeds Rhinos Women and was an integral member of the Leeds squad that won the 2018 Challenge Cup and the League Leaders Shield in the 2018 Women's Super League.

Hill succeeded Lois Forsell as captain of the Rhinos for the 2019 season and was named as the 2019 Telegraph Woman of Steel at the Super League end of season awards on 6 October 2019.

In February 2020 Winfield-Hill signed a short-term contract to play for Sydney Roosters in the 2020 NRL Nines before rejoining the Rhinos for the 2020 Women's Super League.

At the start of the 2022 Winfield-Hill was named in the England 35-strong performance squad ahead of the World Cup. Winfield-Hill qualifies to play for England under residency rules. Winfield-Hill made her debut for England in the 36–10 victory over France on 18 June 2022.

During the World Cup, Winfield-Hill appeared in all four of England's matches ending with the semi-final defeat to New Zealand. After the defeat Winfield-Hill announced her retirement from playing rugby league.

Winfield-Hill also worked as the head academy coach for the Northern Diamonds cricket team. In September 2023 she returned to Australia to become assistant coach at Brisbane Heat.

After making several appearances as part of Sky Sports' commentary team in 2023, Winfield-Hill returned to rugby league when se was named as a member of the Sky team for the 2024 Super League season. At the start of May 2024 it was announced that Winfield-Hill had been appointed as Senior Women and Girls’ Partner at the Rugby Football League (RFL) as well as continuing her media work with Sky.

As well as her role with the RFL, Winfield-Hill also took on other cricket coaching roles. In September 2024 she was assistant coach for the England women's cricket team's tour to Ireland and then another coaching role in the 2024–25 Women's Big Bash League season.

In November 2024, Winfield-Hill was made an assistant coach for England women's tour to South Africa and the 2025 women's Ashes in Australia.

== Personal life ==
In March 2020, Winfield-Hill married England cricketer Lauren Winfield-Hill.

== See also ==
- List of cricket and rugby league players
