= Jenna Foubister =

England international rugby league footballer

Personal information
- Born: 16 January 2007 (age 19) Wigan, Greater Manchester, England

Playing information
- Position: Stand-off, Scrum-half
Club
Years	Team	Pld	T	G	FG	P
2024–	Wigan Warriors	45	23	46	0	184
Representative
Years	Team	Pld	T	G	FG	P
2025–26	England	4	2	0	0	8
- Source: As of 25 October 2026

Jenna Foubister (born 16 January 2007) is an English rugby league footballer who plays as a stand-off for Wigan Warriors in the Women's Super League and England at international level.

== Playing career ==
Foubister started playing rugby with junior clubs Wigan St Cuthberts and Orell St James before being signed by Wigan as a member of the club's academy squad. Foubister was a member of the Rugby Football League's diploma in sporting excellence (DiSE) programme in 2023.

=== 2024 ===
Foubister made her debut Wigan Warriors against the Huddersfield Giants in round 3 of the 2024 season, scoring a try in a 0–102 win at the John Smith's Stadium. She featured a total of nine times throughout the season, scoring a total of six tries, including one in a 18–4 play-off semi final defeat to St Helens.

=== 2025 ===
In the first round of the 2025 Women's Challenge Cup, Foubister scored her first hatrick for Wigan in an 84–0 win over Barrow Raiders.

On 7 June, Foubister played for Wigan in the 2025 Women's Challenge Cup final, defeating St Helens 42–6. Foubister scored two tries and kicked 31 goals in five appearances in the competition, as Wigan claimed their maiden title.

Foubister finished the season with four tries in 13 appearances. She was part of the Wigan Warriors side that completed the treble in the 2025 season, winning the League Leader's Shield, Super League, Women's Challenge Cup, the team also won the RFL Women's Nines.

Foubister was nominated for the 2025 Woman of Steel award alongside fellow Wigan teammates Eva Hunter and Isabel Rowe. The award was won by Hunter.

=== 2026 ===
On 30 May 2026, Foubister was named as the player of the match in Wigan's 54–6 Challenge Cup Final win over St Helens.

Foubister won the 2026 Woman of Steel award having been nominated alongside fellow Wigan teammates Eva Hunter and Megan Williams.

== International career ==
On 9 August 2025, Foubister made her first senior appearance for England against Wales. She scored a try in a 62–0 win.

In September 2026, Foubister was named in the England squad for the 2026 World Cup.

== Club statistics ==
Club	Season	Tier	App	T	G	DG	Pts
Wigan Warriors	2024	Super League	10	6	0	0	24
Wigan Warriors	2025	Super League	18	8	31	0	94
Wigan Warriors	2026	Super League	4	3	0	0	12
Wigan Warriors	2027	Super League					
Wigan Warriors	Total		32	17	31	0	130
Career total			32	17	31	0	130

== Honours ==
=== Wigan Warriors ===
- Super League
  - Winners (1): 2025
  - League Leader's Shield (1): 2025
- Challenge Cup
  - Winners (1): 2025
- RFL Women's Nines
  - Winners (2): 2024, 2025

=== Individual ===
- Woman of Steel:
  - Winner: 2026
