= 2024 RFL Women's Super League =

Women's rugby league competition in Great Britain

- Duration: 14 rounds + playoffs
- Teams: 8
- Matches played: 56
- Points scored: 2,822
- Highest attendance: 4,813: St Helens; vs; York Valkyrie; (6 October)
- Lowest attendance: 461: Barrow Raiders; vs; Wigan Warriors; (15 June)
- Champions: York Valkyrie
- League Leaders Shield Winners: St Helens
- Runners-up: St Helens
- Biggest home win: St Helens 82–0; Warrington Wolves; (20 July); Wigan Warriors 82–0; Warrington Wolves; (1 September)
- Biggest away win: Huddersfield Giants; 0–102; Wigan Warriors; (11 May)
- Woman of Steel: Georgie Hetherington
- Top point-scorer: Faye Gaskin (160)
- Top try-scorer(s): Leah Burke (28), Top goal scorer Faye Gaskin (68)

Promotion and relegation
- Promoted from Championship: Leigh Leopards

The 2024 RFL Women's Super League (also known as the Betfred Women's Super League for sponsorship reasons) was the eighth season of the Women's Super League, for female players in clubs affiliated to the Rugby Football League (RFL).

It was the first season following a re-structure of the women's game. The number of clubs in the Super League was reduced from 12 to 8 but playing as one league rather than two groups of six as in 2023. The regular season comprised 14 rounds commencing on 19 April.

The Super League champions were determined after the top four teams played-off to decide which clubs would compete in the Grand Final on 6 October. York Valkyrie retained their title, after narrowly defeating St Helens 18–8 in the final, which saw a record attendance of 4,813 for a Women's Super League grand final.

The club finishing bottom played-off against the winners of the 2024 RFL Women's Championship for a place in the 2025 RFL Women's Super League. This match, which was also played on 6 October, saw Leigh Leopards promoted from the championship, after they won 34–16 against Featherstone Rovers.

== Teams ==
Locations of 2024 Super League teams

The eight clubs that competed the 2024 Super League were all from Northern England. The six teams of the 2023 Super League Group A were joined by Barrow and Featherstone who won promotion from the 2023 Group B.

- Barrow Raiders
- Featherstone Rovers
- Huddersfield Giants
- Leeds Rhinos
- St Helens
- Warrington Wolves
- Wigan Warriors
- York Valkyrie

== Regular season ==
The season began on 19 April with Leeds Rhinos defeating Warrington Wolves and Wigan Warriors winning against Barrow Raiders in two Friday night fixtures. Also in the opening weekend St Helens lost to York Valkyrie in what proved to be their only loss throughout the regular season. St Helens secured the top place with a win over Warrington in round 13 and were presented with the League Leaders' Shield the following weekend. The teams progressing to the play-offs had been determined by mid August when York's win over Huddersfield Giants opened up a ten-point gap between the top four and the remaining teams with only three rounds to play. Leeds finished second ahead of York who defeated Featherstone Rovers on the final day, but failed to overtake Leeds on points difference. Wigan's loss to Leeds in the penultimate round meant that they finished in fourth place with Barrow taking fifth place. Sixth and seventh place were decided on the final weekend with Huddersfield winning against Warrington. Featherstone, who lost all 14 matches, finished bottom of the table and were relegated following a 34–16 play-off loss to Championship side Leigh Leopards.

=== Table ===
Pos	Team	Pld	W	D	L	PF	PA	PD	Pts	Qualification or relegation (Note: should teams have the same points difference, then position is decided by points scored percentage (points scored, divided by points conceded, multiplied by 100).)
1	St Helens	14	13	0	1	614	88	+526	26	Advance to semi-finals
2	Leeds Rhinos	14	11	0	3	528	122	+406	22	Advance to semi-finals
3	York Valkyrie	14	11	0	3	463	118	+345	22	Advance to semi-finals
4	Wigan Warriors	14	9	0	5	532	144	+388	18	Advance to semi-finals
5	Barrow Raiders	14	5	0	9	172	432	−260	10	
6	Huddersfield Giants	14	4	0	10	204	556	−352	8	
7	Warrington Wolves	14	3	0	11	96	671	−575	6	
8	Featherstone Rovers	14	0	0	14	128	606	−478	0	Relegation playoff

Source: RFL BBC

== Play-offs ==
In the play-off semi-finals York won 12–10 at Leeds and St Helens defeated Wigan 18–4 to set up the Grand Final on 6 October at the Totally Wicked Stadium. St Helens, who had won the Challenge Cup earlier in the season, hosted the match due to their top place finish in the league, but were unable to the claim a treble when York came back from 8–6 down at halftime to win 18–8 and in doing so become the first team to retain the Super League title. The crowd of 4,813 was a record attendance for a Women's Super League grand final.

=== Team bracket ===
Semi-finals
2	Leeds Rhinos	10
3	York Valkyrie	12
1	St Helens	18
4	Wigan Warriors	4

Grand Final
1	St Helens	8
3	York Valkyrie	18

=== Semi-finals ===
22 September 2024
17:00 BST (UTC+01:00)

Leeds Rhinos	10–12	York Valkyrie

Headingley Rugby Stadium, Leeds

22 September 2024
19:30 BST (UTC+01:00)

St Helens	18–4	Wigan Warriors

Totally Wicked Stadium, St Helens, Merseyside

=== Grand final ===
6 October 2024
16:30 BST (UTC+01:00)

St Helens	8–18	York Valkyrie
Tries: Burke 10'; Goals: Gaskin 35, 39'	Report	Tries: Owen 15'; Partington 43' Gentles 55'; Goals: Brennan 16; Marshall 44', 56'

Totally Wicked Stadium
Attendance: 4,813
Referee: Liam Rush
Player of the Match: Georgie Hetherington (York)

Team details
St Helens		Position	York Valkyrie
Name	Number	Position	Number	Name
Beri Salihi	1	FB	5	Georgie Hetherington
Phoebe Hook	20	WG	26	Carrie Roberts
Erin Stott	4	CE	23	Manuqalo Komaitai
Rachel Woosey	30	CE	36	Lisa Parker
Leah Burke 10'	5	WG	2	Ebony Partington
Zoe Harris	6	SO	6	Sade Rihari
Faye Gaskin	7	SH	3	Tamzin Renouf
Vicky Whitfield (substituted off) 27' (substituted on) 61'	8	PR	8	Olivia Wood
Tara Jones (substituted off) 22' (substituted on) 67'	9	HK	29	Izzy Brennan
Chantelle Crowl (substituted off) 30' (substituted on) 61'	10	PF	10	Jasmine Bell
Emily Rudge	12	SR	11	Lacey Owen
Paige Travis	11	SR	12	Savannah Andrade
Jodie Cunningham	13	LF	33	Megan Pakulis
Naomi Williams (substituted on) 30' (substituted off) 61'	14	IN	13	Rhiannon Marshall
Darcy Stott (substituted on) 27' (substituted off) 52'	16	IN	15	Kelsey Gentles
Katie Mottershead (substituted on) 22' (substituted off) 67'	19	IN	18	Jess Sharp
Megan Williams (substituted on) 52' (substituted off) 61'	22	IN	28	Remi Wilton
Matty Smith		Coach		Lindsay Anfield

== Player statistics ==
=== Top 5 try scorers ===
Rank	Player (s)	Club	Tries
1	Leah Burke	St Helens	28
2	Anna Davies	Wigan Warriors	22
3	Eboni Partington	York Valkyrie	18
4	Emma Kershaw	York Valkyrie	17
5	Amelia Brown	Huddersfield Giants	16

=== Top 5 goal scorers ===
Rank	Player (s)	Club	Goals
1	Faye Gaskin	St Helens	68
2	Tara-Jane Stanley	York Valkyrie	42
3	Isabel Rowe	Wigan Warriors	39
4	Emma Knowles	Wigan Warriors	33
5	Keara Bennett	Leeds Rhinos	26

=== Top 5 points scorers ===
Rank	Player (s)	Club	Points
1	Faye Gaskin	St Helens	160
2	Leah Burke	St Helens	112
3	Isabel Rowe	Wigan Warriors	110
4	Tara-Jane Stanley	York Valkyrie	101
5	Anna Davies	Wigan Warriors	88

(Regular season and play-offs)

== End of season awards ==
The End of season awards took place on 8 October 2024, alongside the men's Super League, Championship, and League 1 and Wheelchair Super League awards.

The winners were:

Woman of Steel: Georgie Hetherington (York Valkyrie)
Young player of the year: Bella Sykes (Leeds Rhinos)
Coach of the year: Matty Smith (St Helens)
