= Will Dagger =

English rugby league player (born 1999)

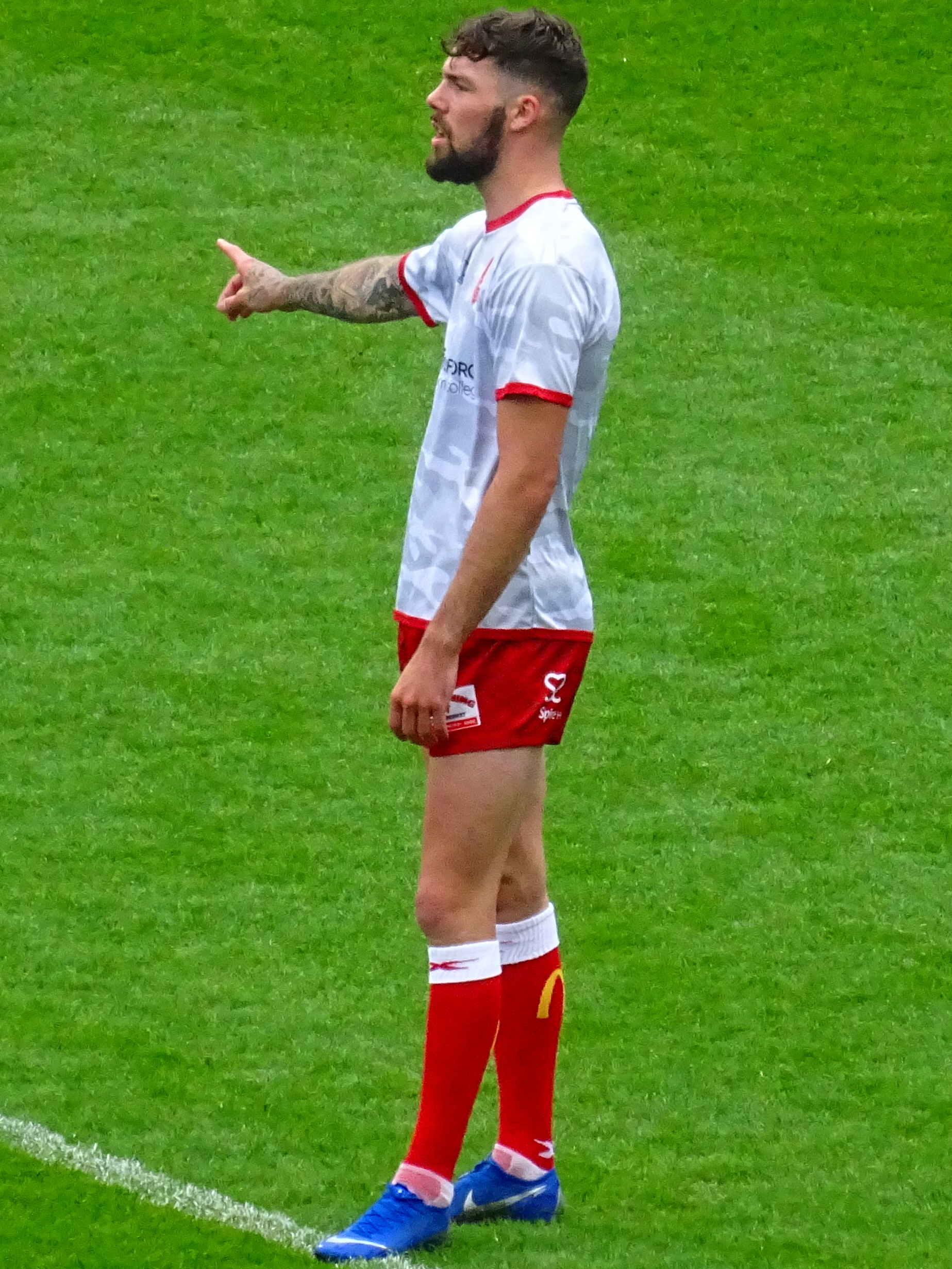

Personal information
- Full name: William Dagger
- Born: 21 February 1999 (age 27) Castleford, West Yorkshire, England
- Height: 5 ft 11 in (1.80 m)
- Weight: 11 st 11 lb (75 kg)

Playing information
- Position: Fullback, Stand-off, Wing
Club
Years	Team	Pld	T	G	FG	P
2017	Warrington Wolves	4	0	0	0	0
2018–23	Hull Kingston Rovers	51	5	29	1	79
2018(DR)	→ York City Knights	4	3	0	0	12
2018(loan)	→ Leigh Centurions	4	1	0	0	4
2019(loan)	→ Featherstone Rovers	4	0	3	0	6
2021(loan)	→ Featherstone Rovers	5	2	0	0	8
2023	Wakefield Trinity	17	2	29	1	67
2024–	York Knights	21	6	61	1	147
2026(loan)	→ Newcastle Thunder	2	1	0	0	4
	Total	112	20	122	3	327
- Source: As of 20 October 2026
- Spouse: Georgie Dagger (m. 2024)

William Dagger (born 21 February 1999) is an English professional rugby league footballer who plays as a fullback, stand-off or winger for the York Knights in the Super League.

He has previously played for the Warrington Wolves, Hull Kingston Rovers and Wakefield Trinity in the Super League. Dagger has spent time on loan from Hull KR at the York City Knights in League 1, and at the Leigh Centurions and Featherstone Rovers in the Championship.

== Personal life ==
Dagger has a son with Georgie Dagger.They married in November 2024.

== Background ==
Dagger was born in Pontefract, West Yorkshire, England.

== Playing career ==
=== Warrington Wolves (2017) ===
In 2017, he made his début for the Warrington Wolves against the Castleford Tigers in a 16-36 Super League defeat.

=== Hull Kingston Rovers (2018–23) ===
In October 2017, Dagger signed a three-year contract to play for Hull Kingston Rovers in the Super League.

On 15 February 2018, he made his Hull Kingston Rovers Super League bow, in a 23-4 victory over the Catalans Dragons.

Dagger made a total of five appearances for Hull KR in the 2021 Super League season including the club's 28-10 semi-final defeat against Catalans Dragons.

=== York City Knights (Dual Reg) ===
Dagger occasionally featured for the York City Knights in 2018, as part of Hull Kingston Rovers dual registration partnership with the club.

=== Leigh Centurions (loan) ===
It was revealed on 26 July 2018, that Dagger would spend the remainder of the 2018 rugby league season at the Leigh Centurions, on a loan basis from his parent-club Hull Kingston Rovers.

Dagger was followed to the Leigh Centurions by two of his current Hull Kingston Rovers teammates in Josh Johnson and Jordan Walne as part of the same loan deal.

Dagger made his Leigh Centurions début against the Sheffield Eagles on 29 July 2018, in a 34-10 triumph in the Championship league competition.

Dagger started the game in the fullback position and he recorded a try on his first appearance for the Leigh Centurions.

=== Featherstone Rovers (loan) ===
On 8 June 2021, it was reported that he had signed for Featherstone in the RFL Championship on loan.

=== Wakefield Trinity ===
In March 2023, Dagger joined Wakefield Trinity and made his club debut in round 7 of the 2023 Super League season against St. Helens which ended in a 38-0 loss. In round 18 of the 2023 Super League season, Dagger kicked a drop goal in golden point extra-time which gave Wakefield Trinity a 27-26 upset victory over Wigan. Dagger played 16 matches for Wakefield Trinity in the Super League XXVIII season as the club finished bottom of the table and were relegated to the RFL Championship which ended their 24-year stay in the top flight.

=== York Knights ===
On 12 October 2023 it was reported that he had returned to play for York Knights on a permanent three-year deal.

=== Newcastle Thunder (loan) ===
On 16 January 2026 it was reported that he had signed for Newcastle Thunder in the RFL Championship on loan
