= 2018 Women's Challenge Cup =

Women's rugby league competition

- Duration: 5 rounds
- Number of teams: 21
- Broadcast partners: Proper Sport; BBC Sport
- Winners: Leeds Rhinos
- Runners-up: Castleford Tigers
- Biggest home win: St Helens 78–0 Hull FC
- Biggest away win: Hull Wyke 0–84 Army RL

The 2018 RFL Women's Challenge Cup was an English rugby league knockout tournament competed for by 21 teams during the summer of 2018. The competition was won by Leeds Rhinos who beat Castleford Tigers 20–14 in the final at the Halliwell Jones Stadium on 4 August 2018.

== Preliminary round ==
The preliminary round ties were played in early May.

Home	Score	Away
Dewsbury Celtic	6–54	Army RL
East Leeds	14–32	Stanningley
Hull F.C.	26–22	Oulton Raidettes
Whitley Bay Barbarians	4–54	Leigh Miners Rangers
Wigan St Patricks	0–24	Widnes Vikings

== First round ==
The first round ties were all played on 3 June. The shock result of the round was the home defeat of the cup holders, Bradford Bulls, by newly formed team Castleford Tigers.

Home	Score	Away
Barrow	62–10	Brighouse Rangers
Bradford Bulls	14–32	Castleford Tigers
Featherstone Rovers	38–12	Stanningley
Hull Wyke	0–84	Army RL
Leeds Rhinos	58–0	Wakefield Trinity
Leigh Miners Rovers	6–72	Wigan Warriors
St Helens	78–0	Hull F.C.
York City Knights	68–0	Widnes Vikings

== Quarter-finals ==
The draw for the quarter-finals of the Cup were made on 6 June. Ties were played on 1 July.

Home	Score	Away
Barrow	6–62	York City Knights
Castleford Tigers	30–16	St Helens
Featherstone Rovers	18–44	Wigan Warriors
Leeds Rhinos	46–10	Army RL

== Semi-finals ==
The draw for the semi-finals was made on 3 July and ties were played 15 July.

Home	Score	Away	Venue
Wigan Warriors	8–26	Leeds Rhinos	Robin Park Arena
Castleford Tigers	48–12	York City Knights	Mend-a-hose Jungle

== Final ==
The final was played as a doubleheader at Warrington Wolves' Halliwell Jones stadium on Saturday 4 August 2018 along with the final of the challenge shield. In conjunction with broadcasters Proper Sport and BBC Sport the games were streamed live.

4 August 2018
3:00 pm BST

Castleford Tigers	14 – 20	Leeds Rhinos
Tries: Katie Hepworth; Tara-Jane Stanley; Georgia Roche; Goals: Katie Hepworth (1/3)	report	Tries: Suze Hill; Caitlin Beevers; Aimee Satveley; Lois Forsell; Goals: Courtney Hill (2/4)

Halliwell Jones Stadium, Warrington
Attendance: 1,022
Referee: Neil Pascall

Teams:
Castleford Tigers:
Backs: Tara-Jane Stanley, Maisie Burton, Courtney Pointon, Lacey Owen, Kelsey Gentles, Georgie Hetherington, Olivia Grace, Lucy Eastwood
Forwards: Lucy Eastwood, Sinead Peach, Jasmine Rowley, Katie Hepworth (c), Beth Weir, Georgia Roche
Interchanges: Jasmine Cudjoe, Tamzin Renouf, Grace Field, Emma Lumley, Marie Colley, Katie Tordoff, Shannelle Mannion

Leeds Rhinos:
Backs: Charlotte Booth, Suze Hill, Sophie Nuttall, Sophie Robinson, Caitlin Beevers, Hanna Butcher, Courtney Hill
Forwards: Amy Johnson, Lois Forsell (c), Danielle Anderson, Aimee Staveley, Manina Spurr, Shannon Lacy
Interchanges: Frankie Townend, Madison Laverick, Chloe Kerrigan, Rhiannon Marshall, Ellie Oldroyd

== Challenge Shield ==
The eight losing teams in the second round entered into a secondary competition, the Challenge Shield. The Shield was won by Bradford Bulls who beat Stanningley 44–16.

=== Quarter-finals ===
Ties were played on 1 July.

Home	Score	Away
Brighouse Rangers	24–0 (Note: Awarded score as Hull Wyke withdrew from the competition before the match was played.)	Hull Wyke
Hull F.C.	0–30	Wakefield Trinity
Stanningley	22–18	Leigh Miners Rangers
Widnes Vikings	0–24 (Note: Awarded score as Widnes withdrew from the competition before the match was played.)	Bradford Bulls

=== Semi-finals ===
The draw was made on 3 July and the matches played on 15 July.

Home	Score	Away
Stanningley	66–4	Brighouse Rangers
Wakefield Trinity	0–58	Bradford Bulls

=== Final ===
4 August 2018
1:00 pm BST

Bradford Bulls	44 – 16	Stanningley
Tries: Leah Jones; Shona Hoyle; Reegan Walker (2); Becky Conlon; Amy Hardcastle (2); Jess Courtman; Goals: Leah Jones (6/8)	report	Tries: Hayley Fielding; Elychia Watson; Goals: Chloe Wainwright-Morley (4/4)

Halliwell Jones Stadium, Warrington
Attendance: 1,022
Referee: Neil Pascall

Teams:
Bradford Bulls:
Backs: Leah Jones, Adara Telemacque, Savannah Andrade, Jess Courtman, Becky Conlon, Danielle Bose, Amy Boardman
Forwards: Lauren Hickey, Chrissi Nettleton, Vicky Rhodes, Shona Hoyle, Heather McDonald, Reegan Walker
Interchanges: Hayley Hields, Memphis Jubb, Stacey Greenwood, Stacey Wilson, Amy Hardcastle, Kirsty Maroney (c), Beth Sutcliffe

Stanningley:
Backs: Hayley Fielding, Allana Walker, Sophie Bickerdyke, Elychia Watson, Lauren Waller, Chloe Wainwright-Morley, Laura Dyson
Forwards: Rachael Barker, Grace Ramsden, Lyndsey Cunnett, Jodie Davies (c), Olivia Wood, Demi Fisher
Interchanges: Markelle Morgan, Louise Travers, Loren Gregory, Leanne May

== See also ==
- 2018 Men's Challenge Cup
