= Leah Jones =

South African cricketer

Leah Jones (born 7 March 2002) is a South African international cricketer who has represented her country in two one-day internationals. Her role is primarily as a right arm seam bowler.

From Cape Town, she was schooled at Groote Schuur High School. She represented Western Province and South Africa at under-19 level, and by the 2022/23, was made captain of the senior Western Province side.

In 2025, her performances for Western Province women led to her being awarded Women's Player of the Year.

She made her international debut on 16 December 2025 against Ireland in an ODI, where she claimed her side's best figures of three wickets for 48 runs in 6 overs and 5 balls.
