= Georgie Dagger =

England international rugby league footballer

Personal information
- Born: 10 September 1997 (age 28) Pontefract, West Yorkshire, England

Playing information
- Position: Hooker, Fullback
Club
Years	Team	Pld	T	G	FG	P
2017–21	Castleford Tigers
2021–	York Valkyrie
	Total	0	0	0	0	0
Representative
Years	Team	Pld	T	G	FG	P
2024	England	1	1	0	0	4
- Spouse: Will Dagger (m. 2024)

Georgie Dagger (née Hetherington; born 10 September 1997) is an English professional rugby league footballer who plays for England at international level and for York Valkyrie at domestic level. Dagger plays predominantly at hooker or fullback.

Dagger was born in Pontefract, West Yorkshire.

== Castleford Tigers ==
In 2017 she was a founder member of the Castleford Tigers women's team.

While as Castleford Dagger played in a team which won the League Leaders' Shield in the 2019 Super League and played in the 2018 Challenge Cup final.

== York Valkyrie ==
In August 2021, Dagger was one of a number of players to leave Castleford to join York (then known as York City Knights Ladies).

Since joining York, Dagger has featured in a team that won the League Leaders' Shield in 2022 and 2023 and won the Grand Final in 2023 and 2024. In the 2024 Grand Final, Dagger was named player of the match.

At the end of season awards, Dagger was named Woman of Steel.

== England ==
Dagger made her international debut for England against France on 29 June 2024. Playing at fullback, Dagger scored a try as England won 42–0.

== Personal life ==
Dagger has a son with Will Dagger. They married in November 2024.
