= Sinead Peach =

England international rugby league player

Personal information
- Born: 4 June 1998 (age 28) Leeds, West Yorkshire, England

Playing information
- Position: Hooker
Club
Years	Team	Pld	T	G	FG	P
2014–17	Featherstone Rovers
2018–21	Castleford Tigers
2021–	York Valkyrie	12	15	0	0	60
	Total	12	15	0	0	60
Representative
Years	Team	Pld	T	G	FG	P
2016–	England	5	1	0	0	4

Sinead Peach (born 4 June 1998) is a professional rugby league footballer who plays internationally for England and for York Valkyrie at domestic level.

Peach was born in Leeds, West Yorkshire and first played rugby league at junior level for Hunslet RLFC.

== Domestic career ==
In 2014, aged 16, Peach joined Featherstone Rovers. In 2017 Peach made the first of four consecutive Challenge Cup final appearances as Featherstone lost to Bradford. The same season Peach was a member of the Featherstone squad that lost the Super League Grand Final, also to Bradford.

The following season Peach moved from Featherstone to Castleford Tigers and in both 2018 and 2019 played on the losing side in Challenge Cup finals, both to Leeds Rhinos. In 2019 Castleford won the League Leaders' Shield but lost the Grand Final to Leeds.

With the 2020 season cancelled due to the COVID-19 pandemic. Peach moved to the, then, York City Knights for 2021. York reached the Challenge Cup final but lost to St Helens. Peach scored York's only try in a 36–6 defeat. At the end of the season, Peach was nominated for the Woman of Steel competition, losing out to Jodie Cunningham.

2022 saw Peach made co-captain of the York team, alongside Katie Langan. Under Peach and Langan's leadership, York won the League Leaders' Shield but lost the Grand Final to Leeds. Peach was nominated for Woman of Steel again but this time lost out to clubmate, Tara-Jane Stanley.

At the end of 2022, Katie Langan retired and Peach was appointed sole captain of the newly named York Valkyrie. York again won the League Leaders' Shield and went one better than 2022 by beating Leeds in the Grand Final. 2023 was also a personal triumph for Peach as she received her third consecutive nomination for Woman of Steel and was named as Woman of Steel in October 2023.

In October 2023 York Valkyrie became the first English club to offer players professional contracts (the club had previously offered travel and expenses) and Peach was one of the first three players to sign a contract.

In 2024, she took a period of maternity leave while she was pregnant with her first child.

In York's August 2025 Super League match against St Helens, Peach was given a red card for making a vulgar comment to the referee, implying that he was in a sexual relationship with a player on the opposing team, following an offside call against her team in the 79th minutes. York lost the game 8–18. The Grade E offence was reviewed by an operational rules tribunal and resulted in a six-game ban for "unacceptable language" and "questioning the integrity of a match official".

In September 2026, Peach scored York's try in their 8–6 win over Wigan in the Grand Final of the 2026 Super League.

== International career ==
Peach was called up for international duties by England while at Featherstone and made her debut for England against France in October 2016 Further caps against France in 2017 and Papua New Guinea in 2019 followed. Peach was not selected for the 2021 World Cup, which was considered a surprise to many. Peach was recalled to the England side for 2023 and played against France in April 2023.
