= Lois Forsell =

England international rugby league footballer

Personal information
- Born: 26 July 1991 (age 34) Leeds, West Yorkshire, England

Playing information
- Position: Hooker
Club
Years	Team	Pld	T	G	FG	P
2007–12	Hunslet Hawks
2012–17	Bradford Bulls Women
2018	Leeds Rhinos Women
	Total	0	0	0	0	0
Representative
Years	Team	Pld	T	G	FG	P
2009	England	18
2018	Yorkshire	1

Coaching information
Club
Years	Team	Gms	W	D	L	W%
2020–	Leeds Rhinos Women
Representative
Years	Team	Gms	W	D	L	W%
2022–	England Women's Knights

Lois Forsell (born 26 July 1991) is a rugby league football coach and former player. She is currently the head coach of Leeds Rhinos Women. During her playing career, she played as a hooker. Forsell has played for Hunslet Women, Bradford Bulls Women, and finished her career at Leeds Rhinos Women in the RFL Women's Super League. She has represented England and Yorkshire at international and intercounty level.

== Playing career ==
Forsell joined Hunslet Ladies (then known as Middleton) before moving to Bradford Bulls in 2012. In 2017 Forsell was a member of the Bradford Bulls team that completed the treble - winning the Grand Final, League Leaders Shield and Challenge Cup in the same season - and went unbeaten all season. Forsell was named Player of the Match in the inaugural Grand Final.

At the end of the 2017 season Forsell was signed for the newly formed Leeds Rhinos Women's team and was named captain of the team for 2018. In her first season charge she led Leeds to victory in the Challenge Cup and top of the league to win the League Leader's Shield but the treble eluded them as they lost the Grand Final to Wigan Warriors - a game Forsell missed through injury. Forsell was nominated for the Woman of Steel award in 2018 but lost out to Castleford Tiger Georgia Roche.

In September 2018 Forsell suffered an anterior cruciate ligament injury which required surgery. Recovery from the surgery prevented her from playing during the 2019 season and a check up towards the end of the season revealed that further surgery would be needed with no guarantee that it would enable Forsell to play again. Forsell therefore decided to retire from playing.

Forsell is a development officer for the Leeds Rhinos Foundation and is the RFL's first women's player ambassador.

== International career ==
Forsell made her debut for the England team in 2009 and was sent off in her first test match. Subsequently she played in two World Cups (2013 and 2017 Women's Rugby League World Cup and was vice-captain for the 2017 tournament.

== Coaching career ==
In February 2020 Forsell was named as the new head coach of the Rhinos women's team replacing Adam Cuthbertson.

== Media career ==
Following her retirement Forsell was announced as one of the presenters of the Sky Sports rugby league show Inside Super League.
