= Caitlin Beevers =

England international rugby league footballer

Personal information
- Full name: Caitlin Hannah Beevers
- Born: 11 October 2001 (age 24) Dewsbury, West Yorkshire, England
- Height: 1.72 m (5 ft 8 in)
- Weight: 60 kg (132 lb; 9 st 6 lb)

Playing information
- Position: Fullback, Wing, Centre
Club
Years	Team	Pld	T	G	FG	P
2018–	Leeds Rhinos	69	39	1	0	158
Representative
Years	Team	Pld	T	G	FG	P
2018–	England	12	10	0	0	40
- Source: As of 2 November 2024

Caitlin Hannah Beevers (born 11 October 2001) is a professional rugby league footballer, who plays as a fullback, centre or wing for Leeds Rhinos in the Super League. She is also a referee.

== Playing career ==
Beevers was a pupil at St John Fisher Catholic Voluntary Academy in Dewsbury and was a member of the school's team that were Champion Schools National Winners in 2016 (Year 10) and August 2017 (Year 10) and won the Year 11 Nation Schools in April 2017. In the 2016 final she was the player of the match scoring four tries in a 46–12 victory over Sirius Academy of Hull. In the April 2017 final Beevers scored 38 points (5 tries and 9 goals) in a 66–0 victory over Shotton Hall of Peterlee. In August 2017, Beevers was awarded the Brenda Dobek Medal (player of the match) and scored 5 tries and 8 goals in a 48–16 win over Castleford Academy. At club level Beevers started her playing career at Birstall Victoria ARLFC as a 7 year old. She later played for Dewsbury Moor and was named "player of the match" after the 2018 Women's Rugby League Association Challenge Cup Final on 1 April 2018 despite being on the losing side as Dewsbury Moor lost 12–15 to Wigan St Patricks.

Having been recruited by Leeds Rhinos Women for their under-19 academy in January 2018, Beevers was subsequently promoted to the first team for the 2018 Women's Super League season.

Beevers was a member of the Leeds Rhinos team that won the 2018 Women's Challenge Cup final and scored a try in the 20–14 win over Castleford Tigers Women.

While at Dewsbury Moor, Beevers played her first representative match when she played for Yorkshire in the Women’s Rugby League Association County of Origin game against Lancashire on 28 January 2018.

Beevers made her international debut for England against France in Carcasonne on 27 October 2018, scoring two tries in England's 54–4 win.

In mid-2024 Beevers suffered a serious knee injury while playing for Leeds against Barrow. Surgery and rehabilitation kept her from playing for over a year and she did not play again until September 2025. Despite her absence from the playing field, Leeds named Beevers as club captain for 2025. After only three matches back Beevers was injured again during the play-off semi-final against Wigan with a tear in the a posterior cruciate ligament in the previously injured knee.

== Refereeing career ==
Beevers started refereeing aged 13 and is a member of Dewsbury & Batley Referees Society. In 2018 she became the first woman to referee a rugby league game at Wembley Stadium when she refereed the Year 7 Boys National Schools Final (the curtain raiser to the Challenge Cup Final).

== Recognition ==
In 2016 Beevers was the player of the match scoring four tries in a 46–12 victory over Sirius Academy of Hull. In August 2017, Beevers was awarded the Brenda Dobek Medal (player of the match) in a 48–16 win over Castleford Academy. She later was named "player of the match" after the 2018 Women's Rugby League Association Challenge Cup Final on 1 April 2018 despite being on the losing side as Dewsbury Moor lost 12–15 to Wigan St Patricks.

Beevers was a nominee for BBC Young Sports Personality of the Year in 2019.

Beevers' name is one of those featured on the sculpture Ribbons, unveiled in 2024.
