= Tara-Jane Stanley =

England women's international rugby league player

Personal information
- Full name: Tara-Jane Stanley
- Born: 4 September 1993 (age 32) Widnes, Cheshire, England,
- Weight: 69 kg (10 st 12 lb)

Playing information
- Position: Fullback, Centre
Club
Years	Team	Pld	T	G	FG	P
2016–17	Thatto Heath Crusaders	5	2	6	0	20
2018–21	Castleford Tigers	5	1	4	0	12
2022–	York Valkyrie	4	10	25	0	90
	Total	14	13	35	0	122
Representative
Years	Team	Pld	T	G	FG	P
2012–	England	19	14	59	0	174
- As of 14 November 2022

Tara-Jane Stanley is an English professional rugby league footballer who plays as a fullback for York Valkyrie in the Women's Super League. She has played at representative level for England, and club level for Thatto Heath Crusaders and Castleford Tigers Women.

== Playing career ==
Stanley began her rugby career playing for Moorfield Angels.

In 2011, Stanley was in the Halton Hillside Hawks team that reached the Championship Final of the Women's Rugby League Conference. Despite losing the game 44–8 to Warrington Wolves, Stanley was named player of the match. As a student as Cronton Sixth Form College in Widnes, Stanley represented the England Women's Students against the Combined Services team.

In 2012, Stanley was part of the Widnes Vikings team that won the Challenge Shield by defeating Stanningley 22–4 in the final. Stanley, who scored two tries, was named player of the match. In 2013, she was named the BARLA Ladies Player of the Year.

In 2016, Stanley scored four tries and kicked seven goals to set a record as the highest scoring player in the Women's Challenge Cup final with 30 points.

She was shortlisted for the inaugural Woman of Steel award in 2018, but lost out to Castleford Tigers teammate Georgia Roche.

In December 2021, it was announced the Stanley had signed for York City Knights for the 2022 season. Stanley won the Woman of Steel award in 2022. Stanley was nominated for Woman of Steel again in 2023 but this time lost out to York teammate Sinead Peach.

In October 2023, York Valkyrie became the first English club to offer professional contracts to players and Stanley was one of the first three to sign a two-year deal.

== Representative career ==
Stanley, who made her England debut in 2012, has heritage number 43. She has represented England at the 2013, 2017 and 2021 World Cups.

In 2018, Stanley was Player of the Match as England beat France 54–4 in Carcassonne.

Stanley was named in the Women's Team of the Tournament at the 2021 World Cup. During the tournament, she scored six tries and nineteen goals to become the top points scorer in the women's competition with a total of 62 points.

=== Test match appearances ===
Cap	Date	Opponent	Position	Tries	Goals	Pts	Match Report	Club
1	15 Jun 2012	France	Fullback	1	6	16	ERL	Widnes
2	11 Jul 2013	France	Fullback	1	0	4	ERL	Crosfields
3	21 Jun 2017	France	Wing	0	3	6	RLC	Thatto Heath-St Helens
4	24 Jun 2017	France	Wing	1	1	6	RLC	Thatto Heath-St Helens
5	16 Nov 2017	Papua New Guinea	Wing	1	4	12	ERL	Thatto Heath St Helens
6	19 Nov 2017	Australia	Wing	0	0	0	ERL	Thatto Heath St Helens
7	22 Nov 2017	Cook Islands	Wing	0	0	0	ERL	Thatto Heath St Helens
8	26 Nov 2017	New Zealand	Wing	1	0	4	ERL	Thatto Heath St Helens
9	27 Oct 2018	France	Fullback	2	5	18	RLC	Castleford Tigers
10	9 Nov 2019	Papua New Guinea	Fullback	0	0	0	RLC	Castleford Tigers
11	16 Nov 2019	Papua New Guinea	Centre	1	2	8	NRL	Castleford Tigers
12	25 Jun 2021	Wales	Fullback	0	6	12	ERL	Castleford Tigers
13	23 Oct 2021	France	Fullback	0	5	10	ERL	Castleford Tigers
14	12 Jun 2022	Wales	Fullback	0	4	8	ERL	York City Knights
15	18 Jun 2022	France	Fullback	0	4	8	ERL	York City Knights
16	1 Nov 2022	Brazil	Centre	2	8	24	ERL	York Valkyrie
17	5 Nov 2022	Canada	Centre	3	5	22	ERL	York Valkyrie
18	9 Nov 2022	Papua New Guinea	Centre	1	5	14	ERL	York Valkyrie
19	14 Nov 2022	New Zealand	Centre	0	1	2	ERL	York Valkyrie
20	29 Apr 2023	France	Fullback	1	8	20	ERL	York Valkyrie
21	4 Nov 2023	Wales	Fullback	2	8	24	ERL	York Valkyrie
