= Women's rugby league in the British Isles =

- Country: Great Britain and Ireland
- Governing body: Rugby Football League (England) (Note: Historically has governed the whole of the UK, currently has limited presence in Scotland and Wales and jointly administers the Great Britain national rugby league team.); Scotland Rugby League (Scotland) (Note: Jointly administers the Great Britain national rugby league team.); Wales Rugby League (Wales); Rugby League Ireland (Ireland)
- National teams: Great Britain women's team (in abeyance): England women's national rugby league team; Wales women's national rugby league team; Ireland women's national rugby league team; Scotland women's national rugby league team
- First played: 1985 (formally)

National competitions
- Domestic Leagues; RFL Women's Super League; RFL Women's Championship; Cups; Women's Challenge Cup

International competitions
- Women's Rugby League World Cup: Women's Rugby League European Championship

Rugby league is an increasingly popular sport for women in Great Britain.

Early instances of women playing rugby league were recorded in the 1930s and 1950s but it was not until the 1980s that the Women's Rugby League Association was formed and the first league was organised. Since then expansion has been gradual with a multi-level competition being established in 2014 by the Rugby Football League (RFL), mirroring the structure in the men's game. In 2023 the first steps towards the game turning professional were taken as Super League clubs York Valkyrie and Leeds Rhinos introducing payments for players.

Each of the four nations, England, Scotland, Wales and Ireland has their own governing body and run their own national teams. It is the RFL, the national governing body of the sport in England, that organises most women's competitions including these which have teams from the other nations participating.

Between 1996 and 2003 a Great Britain national team existed but since then each nation has had its own national team.

== History ==
=== Early history ===
Instances of women playing rugby league as opposed to being involved in the running of the game are sparse in the first 80 years of the sport. Games are recorded as being played during the lockout of miners in 1921, and during the 1926 General Strike. Three games were played in Workington in 1953 during celebrations for the Coronation of Elizabeth II.

=== Women's Amateur Rugby League Association ===
In 1978, 13-year-old Elisabeth Beale was, at first, banned and then given permission to play for amateur club, Normanton. Increasing interest for playing lead to the formation of teams and in December 1981 a seven-a-side tournament was organised by the Underbank club in Huddersfield, which attracted eight teams.

The Women's Amateur Rugby League Association was formed in 1985 and the following year the first league competition was played with six teams participating. By 1993 the league had expanded to two divisions with 16 teams competing. Over the next two decades the game stagnated due to organisational disputes and sexism within the sport.

=== RFL control ===
At the end of 2011 the RFL established the Women's Rugby League Championship. In the 2014 season, this had a Premier Division and a Division 1 which was played for by 13 teams, five in the Premier Division and 11 in Division 1.

In 2017, the RFL re-organised the league into a structure mirroring the men's game with three divisions, Super League, Championship and League 1. The change in structure also saw a change towards a majority of teams in the leagues becoming associated with the professional men's clubs rather than amateur clubs.

The growing importance of the women's game was recognised when Betfred agreed to sponsor the Super League and subsequently the Challenge Cup alongside the company's sponsorship of the men's game.

By 2023 the women's game has 43 clubs in five divisions, Super League, Super League South, Championship, League 1 and League 2. For 2024 a major restructure is planned which will see Super League comprise eight teams with four regional leagues forming the next tier. Below the regional leagues will be local leagues.

2023 saw the first steps towards the women's game in Britain becoming professional as York and Leeds announced they would match matchday payments.

The sport has become more popular with the number of women and girls playing increasing by 53% between 2017 and 2021.

Under the reforms to be made to the men's game, which re-introduce licensing, having a women's team will become a requirement for a men's club to obtain the top grade licence.

== National team ==
A Great Britain national team first appeared in 1989 when two games of and pass rugby were played against France.

The first major tour for the Great Britain team came in 1996 when a tour to Australia was undertaken. Between 1996 and 2002 the team played against southern hemisphere teams in tours and World Cup competitions. From 2007 the Great Britain team was put into abeyance and each nation developed its own team. England played their first game in 2007 against France. Wales played their first match in 2021. Ireland also played their first match in 2021. Scotland played their first match in 2025.

== Domestic competitions ==
=== League structure ===
The RFL has run the Women's Super League, Championship, League 1 and League 2 for teams across England, Scotland, and Wales since 2017. However all teams currently competing are from northern England due to the geographic variance in the sports popularity. In 2021 the Super League South was launched for clubs in southern England and Wales. Women's Super League Midlands and North regional competitions were launched in 2023.

From 2024 the Championship was expanded to three regional leagues; the original Championship became the Northern Championship, with the regional Super League competitions, South and Midlands, becoming the Midlands and Southern Championships. These regional leagues will have opportunity for promotion to the Super League.

==== Wales ====
In 2019, Wales Rugby League launch a domestic league outside the RFL with all teams based in South Wales. The leading club in Wales, Cardiff Demons, however plays in the southern division of the RFL Women's Championship. From 2021 to 2023 this was the RFL Women's Super League South which Cardiff won in both 2021 and 2022.

=== Challenge Cup ===
A Challenge Cup competition was started in 2012. In 2023 the final of the competition was played at Wembley Stadium for the first time as part of a finals day with the final of the men's Cup, the final of the 1895 Cup and the year 7 schools final.

== See also ==
- Women's rugby league in Australia
- Rugby league in the British Isles
- British rugby league system
