= 2024 RFL Women's Championship =

- Teams: 9 (Northern); 4 (Midlands); 4 (Southern)

The 2024 RFL Women's Championship (also known as the Betfred Women's Championship for sponsorship reasons) was the eighth season of the RFL Women's Championship and the first of its restructure and expansion to include teams from across the country.

The competition was split into three regional leagues: Northern, Midlands, and Southern. The winners of the Northern and Southern Championship faced each other for the National Championship title and the winner of this match entered a promotion play-off on 6 October with the last placed team of the 2024 RFL Women's Super League for a place in the 2025 Super League.

The Northern Championship was won by Leigh Leopards and the Southern Championship was won by London Broncos. Leigh defeated London in the National Championship Final and then won against Featherstone Rovers in the promotion play-off.

The Midlands Championship was jointly awarded to Leamington Royals and Nottingham Outlaws.

== Teams ==
In January 2024, the RFL confirmed the nine clubs in the Northern Championship and four of the clubs in Southern Championship. The teams in the Midlands Championship were announced in May.

Northern	Midlands	Southern
Bradford Bulls; Castleford Tigers; Dewsbury Moor; Hull Kingston Rovers; Leigh Leopards; Oulton Raidettes; Salford Red Devils; Sheffield Eagles; Stanningley	Coventry Bears; Leamington Royals; Nottingham Outlaws; Telford Raiders	Army; Bedford Tigers; Cardiff Demons; London Broncos

== Northern Championship ==
The 2024 RFL Northern Women's Championship began on 2 March and concluded on 22 September, and comprised 18 regular season matchweeks and playoffs.

=== Table ===
Pos	Team	Pld	W	D	L	PF	PA	PD	Pts	
1	Leigh Leopards (L)	16	16	0	0	808	64	+744	32	Advance to semi-finals
2	Sheffield Eagles	16	12	1	3	453	237	+216	25	Advance to semi-finals
3	Salford Red Devils	16	10	0	6	392	248	+144	20	Advance to semi-finals
4	Oulton Raidettes	16	10	0	6	430	296	+134	20	Advance to semi-finals
5	Dewsbury Moor	16	8	1	7	388	254	+134	17	
6	Hull Kingston Rovers	16	7	0	9	298	424	−126	14	
7	Bradford Bulls	16	3	0	13	182	518	−336	6	
8	Stanningley	16	2	1	13	208	464	−256	5	
9	Castleford Tigers	16	2	1	13	83	737	−654	4 (Note: Deducted 1 point for forfeited fixture on 8 September)	

(L) League Leaders' Shield Winners

=== Results ===
Home \ Away	LEI	SHE	SAL	OUL	DEW	HKR	BRA	STA	CAS
Leigh Leopards	—	42–14; 14 Apr	40–0; 10 Mar	46–8; 23 Jun	48–4; 21 Apr	52–8; 12 May	60–0; 31 Aug	70–6; 16 Jun	96–4; 4 Aug
Sheffield Eagles	6–30; 14 Jul	—	40–20; 19 May	26–16; 11 Aug	24–6; 8 Sep	56–8; 7 Jul	38–0; 21 Apr	36–6; 28 Apr	32–0; 23 Jun
Salford Red Devils	4–44; 7 Jul	26–6; 18 Aug	—	16–14; 28 Apr	14–12; 2 Jun	4–16; 2 Mar	44–4; 14 Apr	48–4; 21 Jul	48–0; 8 Sep
Oulton Raidettes	6–26; 3 Mar	32–46; 12 May	30–14; 4 Aug	—	18–16; 18 Aug	30–10; 8 Sep	42–18; 7 Jul	30–12; 14 Apr	42–8; 2 Jun
Dewsbury Moor	0–26; 21 Jul	20–30; 16 Jun	8–0; 1 Sep	40–14; 19 May	—	16–24; 14 Apr	24–10; 28 Apr	20–20; 17 Mar	48–4; 7 Jul
Hull Kingston Rovers	4–58; 11 Aug	20–28; 30 Jun (Note: originally scheduled for 8 March but postponed due to waterlogged pitch)	22–24; 23 Jun	0–28; 16 Jun	0–56; 14 Jul	—	32–8; 19 May	20–12; 1 Sep	70–8; 21 Apr
Bradford Bulls	0–62; 2 Jun	10–46; 21 Jul	0–18; 14 Jul	8–22; 10 Mar	6–52; 4 Aug	10–24; 18 Aug	—	20–14; 23 Jun	54–4; 12 May
Stanningley	0–24; 8 Sep	0–18; 4 Aug	8–20; 21 Apr	4–62; 14 Jul	16–24; 12 May	12–26; 2 Jun	22–28; 3 Mar	—	30–12; 24 Mar
Castleford Tigers	0–84; 28 Apr	C–C; 3 Mar (Note: scheduled for 3 March but cancelled due to waterlogged pitch – result given as a draw)	0–92; 16 Jun	6–36; 1 Sep	0–42; 10 Mar	16–14; 21 Jul	14–6; 11 Aug	6–42; 19 May	—

Legend: Blue = home team win; Yellow = draw; Red = away team win.

== Southern Championship ==
The restructuring of the national pyramid meant that the Super League South was replaced by the Southern Championship with four of the six of clubs from the 2023 Super League South continuing in the new competition format. The two other teams took part in the tier 3 competitions sitting directly below the Southern Championship: Thurrock combined with North Herts Crusaders to compete in the Southern East League 1, and the Bristol Golden Ferns were part of the Southern West League 1. The Southern Championship started on 25 May and concluded on 7 September with the Grand Final played at Cardiff University playing fields.

=== Table and results ===
Pos	Team	Pld	W	D	L	PF	PA	PD	Pts	CAR	LON	ARM	BED
1	Cardiff Demons	6	5	0	1	246	66	+180	10	—	22–0	52–6	72–8
2	London Broncos	6	5	0	1	218	50	+168	10	18–14	—	48–8	48–0
3	Army	6	2	0	4	150	202	−52	4	34–38	6–36	—	48–0 (Note: Match forfeited)
4	Bedford Tigers	6	0	0	6	36	332	−296	−1 (Note: Bedford deducted 1 point: forfeited fixture (Army v Bedford: 20 July))	0–48	0–68	28–48	—

== Midlands Championship ==
The 2024 Midlands Championship was played using a festival format and because of this the teams were ineligible for the National Championship Final. The competition saw a soft launch in 2023 and was played between Cheltenham Phoenix, Coventry Bears, Leamington Royals, and Telford Raiders. Nottingham Outlaws replaced Cheltenham in the schedule for the 2024 competition which began on 1 June and in which teams played two games on each of the three fixture days, followed by a finals day on 4 August. The final between Nottingham and Lemington was abandoned due to a significant player injury. Both teams were awarded the title.

== Play-offs ==
In the Southern play-offs, London Broncos advanced to the Grand Final as the Army forfeited their semi-final match. The Southern Grand Final was played on 7 September at Cardiff University Playing Fields. In a repeat of the 2023 Super League South competition, London Broncos faced Cardiff Demons in the final and defeated them 28–8 to win the competition.

The Northern Championship semi-finals were played on 15 September. Leigh Leopards, who won the League Leaders' Shield, advanced to the final after fourth-placed Oulton Raidettes forfeited their semi-final match. They were joined by second-placed Sheffield Eagles who defeated third-placed Salford Red Devils. The Northern Championship Grand Final was played on 22 September. Leigh Leopards won 46–6 against Sheffield Eagles to claim the division title and advance to the National Championship match.

The National Championship Final was played on 29 September by the winners of the Northern and Southern Championship. Leigh Leopards defeated London Broncos 22–18 to win the title.

The promotion play-off match was contested by the winner of the Championship Grand Final and the last placed team of the 2024 RFL Women's Super League, and took place on 6 October as a double-header with the Grand Final of the Super League. Leigh Leopards defeated Featherstone Rovers 34–16 to earn promotion to the Super League.

=== Team bracket ===
Northern semi-finals
N1	Leigh Leopards	48
N4	Oulton Raidettes	0
N2	Sheffield Eagles	20
N3	Salford Red Devils	6
Southern semi-finals
S2	London Broncos	48
S3	Army	0

Northern Grand Final
N1	Leigh Leopards	46
N2	Sheffield Eagles	6
Southern Grand Final
S1	Cardiff Demons	8
S2	London Broncos	28

National Championship Final
N1	Leigh Leopards	22
S2	London Broncos	18

Promotion/Relegation play-off
SL	Featherstone Rovers	16
N1	Leigh Leopards	34

=== Southern play-offs ===
Southern Championship: Semi-finals
Home	Score	Away	Match Information	
Home	Score	Away	Date	Venue
London Broncos	48–0 (Note: Match forfeited)	Army	18 August	Rosslyn Park
Cardiff Demons	–	Bye	—N/a	—N/a

Southern Championship: Grand Final
Home	Score	Away	Match Information	
Home	Score	Away	Date	Venue
Cardiff Demons	8–28	London Broncos	7 September	Cardiff University Playing Fields

=== Northern play-offs ===
Northern Championship: Semi-finals
Home	Score	Away	Match Information	
Home	Score	Away	Date	Venue
Leigh Leopards	48–0 (Note: Match forfeited)	Oulton Raidettes	15 September	Twist Lane
Sheffield Eagles	20–6	Salford Red Devils	15 September	Sheffield Hallam University Sports Park

Northern Championship: Grand Final
Home	Score	Away	Match Information	
Home	Score	Away	Date	Venue
Leigh Leopards	46–6	Sheffield Eagles	22 September	Twist Lane

=== National Championship Final ===
National Championship Final
Northern	Score	Southern	Match Information	
Northern	Score	Southern	Date	Venue
Leigh Leopards	22–18	London Broncos	29 September	Alexander Stadium, Birmingham

=== Promotion play-off match ===
Promotion Play-off Match
Super League	Score	Championship	Match Information	
Super League	Score	Championship	Date	Venue
Featherstone Rovers	16–34	Leigh Leopards	6 October	Totally Wicked Stadium
