= London Broncos Women =

English women's rugby league team

Club information
- Colours: Navy and Red
- Founded: 2021; 5 years ago
- Website: Official website

Current details
- Ground: Hazelwood
- Competition: National Championship
- 2026: 2nd (Champions)
- Current season

Records
- Super League South: 1 (2023)
- Southern Championship: 1 (2024)
- National Championship: 1 (2026)

London Broncos Women are the women's rugby league team of London Broncos. They play their home matches at Hazelwood in south-west London, England. The team was established in 2021 and initially competed in the Super League South and then its successor competition, the Women's Southern Championship, in 2024. In December 2024, it was announced that the club would join the Northern Championship. The team, which was originally known as London Broncos Ladies, changed its name to London Broncos Women in April 2025. In the 2026 season, they won the National Championship and earned promotion to the Super League.

== History ==
Club logo for the women's team used for 2021–2022 seasons, the purple was replaced with red for the 2023–2025 seasons

In 2021, London Broncos formed a women's team to take part the inaugural season of the RFL Women's Super League South. The played in the opening fixture of the competition, winning 20–12 against the Army with Courtney Treco scoring the first try for the Broncos. London went on to reach the play-offs, but lost 38–20 to Cardiff Demons in the semi-finals.

In 2022, the Broncos went unbeaten throughout the regular season to finish top of the table. Results included a team record win of 104–0 over Oxford Cavaliers. London qualified for their first final with a 44–6 semi-final win against Bedford Tigers, but then lost 34–4 to Cardiff in the Grand Final. Following the 2022 season, Lauren Mueller was selected to represent Canada at the 2021 Women's Rugby League World Cup.

In February 2023, four of the Broncos first team players were selected for the England Community Lions and the Broncos took part in the Women's Challenge Cup for the first time where they faced the cup holders, St Helens, in their opening group match losing 76–0. Although they did not advance from the group stage, they recorded their first victory in the cup with a 40–4 win over Castleford Tigers. In the league, London finished second in the table having lost only once in the regular season; 8–10 to Cardiff. They won their semi-final 22–12 against Army RL to set up a rematch of the 2022 Grand Final. On 27 August, London Broncos defeated Cardiff 22–10 to take the 2023 Women's Super League South title.

In the 2024 season, London qualified for Challenge Cup through having been a finalist in their 2023 league campaign. In a repeat of the 2023 competition, they were drawn against St Helens in their opening match and exited the competition at the group stage. Following the restructuring of the women's league pyramid the Super League South became the Southern Women's Championship. As a tier two competition this offered an opportunity for promotion to the Super League via a National Championship final and a promotion/relegation play-off. On 7 September, London defeated Cardiff 28–8 in the Grand Final of the Southern Championship to qualify for the National Championship final. The final was played on 29 September at the Alexander Stadium in Birmingham. Their opponents, Leigh Leopards, scored a late try to win the match 22–18.

In December 2024, the Rugby Football League announced a restructuring of the league system which would see the club transferred to an expanded Northern Championship in the 2025 season. In April 2025, the team changed its name from London Broncos Ladies to London Broncos Women. In the 2025 season, they reached the quarter-finals of the Challenge Cup and finished top of the Northern Championship but lost 20–10 to Featherstone Rovers in the Grand Final.

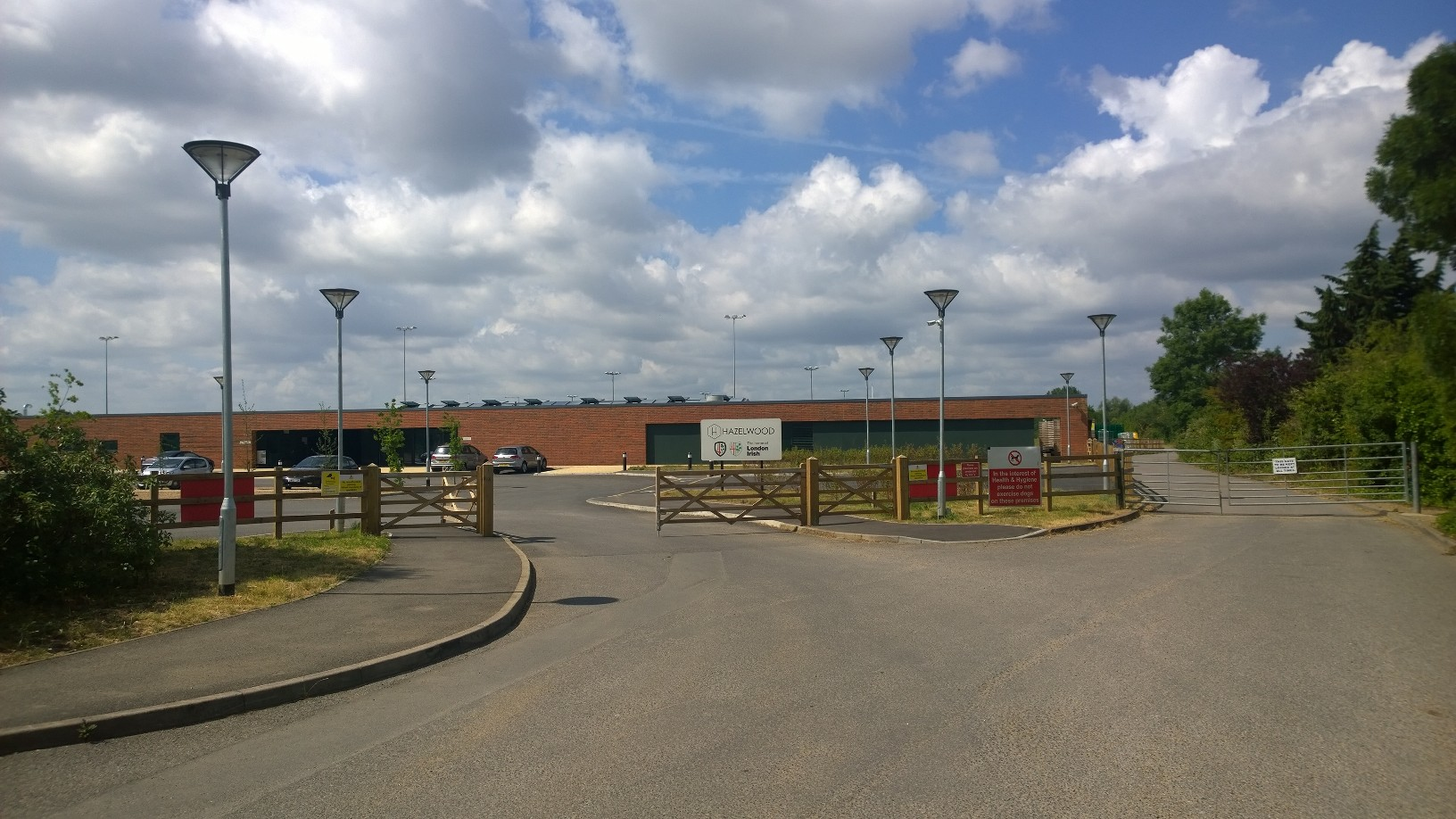
The Hazelwood Centre, the new home ground of the London Broncos Women's team

In November 2025, Broncos Women announced Hazelwood in Sunbury-on-Thames as their new ground for 2026. The move coincided with the men's professional club taking over the facilities which had been vacated by professional rugby union side London Irish when they went into administration. In the 2026 Challenge Cup, London reached the quarter-finals where they lost 112–0 to Wigan Warriors. In the National Championship, they finished second in the table before defeating Cardiff Demons in the play-off semi-final. In the Grand Final, they overcame league leaders Manchester Swinton Lionesses 28–10 to set up a promotion play-off against Leigh Leopards which they won 36–6 to secure a place in the 2027 Super League.

== Seasons ==
Season	League									Play-offs	Challenge Cup
Season	Division	P	W	D	L	F	A	Pts	Pos	Play-offs	Challenge Cup
2021	Super League South: Eastern Conference	4	3	0	1	104	90	6	2nd	Lost in Semi Final	—N/a
2022	Super League South	5	5	0	0	240	76	10	1st	Lost in Grand Final	—N/a
2023	Super League South	5	4	0	1	134	42	8	2nd	Won in Grand Final	GS
2024	Southern Championship	6	5	0	1	218	50	10	2nd	Won in Grand Final; Lost in National Final	GS
2025	Northern Championship	10	9	1	0	402	94	19	1st	Lost in Grand Final	QF
2026	National Championship	10	1	1	0	474	136	21	1st	Won in Grand Final; Won in promotion play-off	QF

== Honours ==
- Super League South
  - League Leaders' Shield: 2022
  - Champions: 2023
- Southern Championship
  - Champions: 2024
- Northern/National Championship
  - League Leaders' Shield: 2025
  - Champions: 2026

== Internationals ==
Players who earned international caps while playing for London Broncos:

- Canada
  - Lauren Mueller
- Ireland
  - Iona McCusker
  - Polly Roberts
  - Jade Walker
- Jamaica
  - Emily Bell
  - Gianna Noble-Cunningham
- Netherlands
  - Nicole Kennedy
- Nigeria
  - Danyelle Shobanjo
- Scotland
  - Rebecca Smart
  - Sarah Smart
- United States
  - Courtney Treco
- Wales
  - Emily Hughes
  - Ffion Lewis
  - Jade Mullen
  - Kathryn Salter
