= 2021 RFL Women's Super League South =

- Teams: 6
- Matches played: 14 (1 Cancelled)
- Champions: Cardiff Demons

The 2021 Rugby Football League Women's Super League South (known as the Betfred Women's Super League South due to sponsorship) was the inaugural season of the Women's Super League South rugby league competition composed of teams from the south of England and Wales. It was originally intended to start in 2020, but was delayed due to the COVID-19 pandemic.

The final fixture list was released on 9 June, and the first match took place on Saturday 19 June.

The grand final saw the Cardiff Demons come from behind in the dying seconds of the match to win the game 30–26.

== Teams ==
- Locations of teams in Southern England and Wales
- Western Conference, Eastern Conference

Conference	Team	Location	Head coach	Home ground
Eastern	Army RL	Aldershot, England	Woz Broadley	Aldershot Military Stadium
Eastern	Bedford Tigers	Bedford, England	Rob Ashton	Pudhoe Woods
Eastern	London Broncos	London, England	Colin Baker	TBC
Western	Cardiff Demons	Cardiff, Wales	Ian Newbury	Cardiff Arms Park
Western	Cornish Rebels	Redruth, England	Ronan O'Neill	Recreation Ground, Redruth
Western	Golden Ferns	Bristol, England	Emily White	SGS Stoke Gifford Stadium

== Regular season ==
=== Western Conference ===
==== Standings ====
Pos	Team	Pld	W	D	L	PF	PA	PD	Pts	Qualification
1	Cardiff Demons	4	4	0	0	314	6	+308	8	Play-off semi-finals
2	Golden Ferns	4	1	1	2	56	222	−166	3	Play-off semi-finals
3	Cornish Rebels	4	0	1	3	28	170	−142	1	

==== Fixtures ====
Betfred Women's Super League South - Western Conference
Home	Score	Away	Match Information
Home	Score	Away	Date and Time	Venue	Referee
Golden Ferns	32–10	Cornish Rebels	26 June 2021, 14:30	SGS College Stoke Gifford Stadium	M. Holmes
Golden Ferns	6–88	Cardiff Demons	3 July 2021	Filton College, Bristol, England	K. Young
Cornish Rebels	C–C	Cardiff Demons	—N/a (Note: Match cancelled due to COVID-19 issues.)
Cornish Rebels	18–18	Golden Ferns	24 July 2021	Recreation Ground, Redruth
Cardiff Demons	96–0	Cornish Rebels	31 July 2021	USW Sport Park, Treforest
Cardiff Demons	106–0	Golden Ferns	7 August 2021	USW Sport Park, Treforest

=== Eastern Conference ===
==== Standings ====
Pos	Team	Pld	W	D	L	PF	PA	PD	Pts	Qualification
1	Army RL	4	3	0	1	168	66	+102	6	Play-off semi-finals
2	London Broncos	4	3	0	1	104	90	+14	6	Play-off semi-finals
3	Bedford Tigers	4	0	0	4	74	190	−116	0	

==== Fixtures ====
Betfred Women's Super League South - Eastern Conference
Home	Score	Away	Match Information
Home	Score	Away	Date and Time	Venue	Referee
Army RL	12–20	London Broncos	19 June 2021, 14:30	Aldershot Military Stadium	Pete Smith
Bedford Tigers	16–24	London Broncos	3 July 2021	Putnoe Woods, Bedford
Bedford Tigers	18–68	Army RL	10 July 2021	Putnoe Woods, Bedford
London Broncos	18–32	Army RL	24 July 2021	Richmond Athletics Association, Richmond	Matt Rigby
Army RL	56–10	Bedford Tigers	31 July 2021	Aldershot Military Stadium
London Broncos	42–30	Bedford Tigers	7 August 2021	Trailfinders Sports Ground

== Finals series ==
The finals series saw the team finishing first in the Western Conference, Cardiff Demons, take on the team finishing second in the Eastern Conference, London Broncos; and first in the Eastern Conference, Army RL, versus second in the Western Conference, the Golden Ferns, in a double header at the Aldershot Military Stadium.

Betfred Women's Super League South finals
Home	Score	Away	Match Information
Home	Score	Away	Date and Time	Venue	Referee
Semi-finals
Army RL	110–0	Golden Ferns	14 August 2021, 13:00	Aldershot Military Stadium	Pete Smith
Cardiff Demons	38–20	London Broncos	14 August 2021, 15:00	Aldershot Military Stadium	Pete Smith
Grand Final
Army RL	26–30	Cardiff Demons	29 August 2021, 12:00	Trailfinders Sports Ground	Stuart Fraser
