= Cardiff Demons =

Defunct men's and active women's Welsh amateur rugby league club, based in Cardiff

Club information
- Full name: Cardiff Demons Rugby League Football Club
- Colours: Black, red and white (Men); Blue (Women)
- Founded: 1997; 29 years ago (Men's); 2021; 5 years ago (Women's)
- Website: Cardiff Demons (Ladies); Archived Mens website

Current details
- Ground: St. Peters RFC, Cardiff (Men's team) Cardiff University Sports Fields, Cardiff (Women's team)
- Competition: RFL Women's Championship

The Cardiff Demons RLFC name has been used multiple times over the years. Firstly for a now-defunct men's rugby league side, and subsequently for a women's rugby league side who began in 2021.

The men's side played out of St. Peters RFC in the east of Cardiff, Wales and played in the Welsh Premier of the Rugby League Conference.

The women's team competed in the RFL Women's Super League South from its inaugural season in June 2021. In 2024 this was replaced by the Southern Championship. In 2025, Cardiff transferred to the Northern Championship which was renamed as the National Championship the following season.

== History ==
=== Men's team: 1997–2014 ===
Men's Club Logo

Cardiff Demons were formed in 1997. In 2001, they joined the Central South Division of the Rugby League Conference. Playing at St. Peters RFC, a two miles north of the city centre, the Demons succeeded in finishing in third place.

For the 2002 season the Demons moved to Old Penarthians RFC in Penarth. Again competing in the Central South Division, Cardiff secured the runners up spot.

In 2003, the Demons finished top of the South West Conference, but failed to progress in the play-offs.

In 2004, the Demons moved to Taff's Well, joined the Welsh Conference and won two trophies. First was the Welsh Shield after beating Newport Titans, then beating Thorne Moor Marauders in National Shield.

The Demons moved back to St Peters RFC after one home match of 2006 and went on to win the East Division and reach the Welsh Conference Grand Final, only to lose 22–10 to Bridgend Blue Bulls. In 2009 they relocated to St Albans RFC in Tremorfa.

At the end of 2014, the two main Rugby League clubs in the city, Demons and the Cardiff Spartans decided to merge. The result was Cardiff City RL, which in 2017 was rebranded as Cardiff Blue Dragons RLFC (a resurrection of the name of the last professional RL side in Cardiff and kit colours).

=== Women's team: 2021–present ===
After a number of years of dormancy, the Cardiff Demons name was resurrected in 2021 for a new women's rugby league team, set to compete in the inaugural season of the RFL Women's Super League South competition, starting in June 2021. The club won the inaugural season beating the Army team 30-26 and retained the title the following season with a Grand Final win over London Broncos.

In 2023, Cardiff made their first appearance in the Challenge Cup and reached the quarter-finals due to wins over Featherstone Rovers and Salford Red Devils in the group stage. They also took part in the RFL Women's Nines where they earned a wildcard place in the finals. In the league the Demons went undefeated in the regular season, but lost 22–10 to London Broncos in the Grand Final.

In 2024, Cardiff reached the quarter-finals of the Challenge Cup and the semi-finals of the Women's Nines, before losing to Wigan Warriors in both competitions. The Super League South became the Southern Championship, a second-tier competition, in which Cardiff finished top of the table, but lost 28–8 to London Broncos in the final. In December 2024, the Rugby Football League announced a further restructuring of the league system which would see the club transferred to an expanded Northern Championship in the 2025 season.

In April 2026, it was announced that Cardiff Demons had formed a partnership with South Wales Jets and that the Demons would take on the South Wales Jets name at the conclusion of the 2026 Season. In the 2026 Challenge Cup, Cardiff reached the quarter-finals in which they lost to Leeds Rhinos. In the 2026 National Championship, they finished in third place before losing their play-off semi-final 44–6 against London Broncos.

== Women's team seasons ==
Season	League									Play-offs	Challenge Cup	Ref
Season	Division	P	W	D	L	F	A	Pts	Pos	Play-offs	Challenge Cup	Ref
2021	Super League South: Western Conference	4	4	0	0	314	6	8	1st	Won in Grand Final	—N/a	
2022	Super League South	5	4	0	1	298	32	8	2nd	Won in Grand Final	—N/a	
2023	Super League South	5	5	0	0	168	22	10	1st	Lost in Grand Final	QF	
2024	Southern Championship	6	5	0	1	246	66	10	1st	Lost in Southern Final	QF	
2025	Northern Championship	10	7	1	2	290	122	15	3rd	Lost in semi-final	QF	
2026	National Championship	12	9	0	3	520	141	18	3rd	Lost in semi-final	QF	

== Honours ==
=== Men's honours ===
- RLC South West Division: 2003
- Welsh Shield: 2004
- RLC Shield: 2004
- Welsh Nines Winners: 2006, 2008
- Welsh Premier (East): 2006

=== Women's honours ===
- Super League South: 2021, 2022

== See also ==
- Sport in Cardiff
- Rugby League in Wales
- Wales Rugby League
- List of rugby league clubs in Britain
