= RFL Women's Championship seasons (2017–2023) =

RFL Women's Championship seasons 2017–2023

The RFL Women's Championship is the second tier of women's rugby in the British rugby league system sitting below the RFL Women's Super League.

The competition was founded in 2017, and was a single leagued division with all teams based in Northern England due to geographic distribution of the sport's popularity. However, starting in 2024, in response to the increase in popularity of women's rugby league outside of Northern England, the Championship was expanded to include a Midlands and South group for teams elsewhere in the county, allowing a route to the Super League for all teams.

The following article summarises the results of the competition before its 2024 expansion:

== Key ==
Source (Note: League tables on the RFL "Match Centre" include some results from play-off matches. In 2018, for example the table includes the Grand Final (but not semi-finals) meaning Wakefield appear below Stanningley though they finished the regular season above them on points difference.)

Key

Promoted to next season's Super League
Transfer to the 2024 Northern Championship
(C) Champions

== 2017 season ==
The 2017 season did not begin until 23 July and as a result of this the teams only played each other once during the competition. Stanningley went unbeaten throughout the 2017 season to finish top of the Championship and defeated Oulton Raidettes 28–10 in the Grand Final.

POS	CLUB	P	W	L	D	PF	PA	DIFF	PTS
1	Stanningley (C)	6	6	0	0	232	60	172	12
2	Oulton Raidettes	6	4	1	1	186	76	110	9
3	Wigan St Patricks	6	4	2	0	190	76	114	8
4	Leigh Miners Rangers	6	3	3	0	120	98	22	6
5	Wakefield Trinity	6	2	3	1	110	114	-4	5
6	Barrow	6	1	5	0	34	282	-248	2
7	Batley Bulldogs	6	0	6	0	12	178	-166	0

=== 2017 play-offs ===
Semi-finals
1	Stanningley	60
4	Leigh Miners Rangers	4
2	Oulton Raidettes	12
3	Wigan St Patricks	10

Final
Stanningley	28
Oulton Raidettes	10

== 2018 season ==
Stanningley repeated their success in 2018 with a 20–12 win over Leigh Miners Rangers. Wakefield Trinity, who finished top of the Championship in 2018, joined the Super League in 2019.

POS	CLUB	P	W	L	D	PF	PA	DIFF	PTS
1	Stanningley (C)	15	12	3	0	438	168	270	24
2	Wakefield Trinity	14	11	3	0	390	126	264	22
3	Oulton Raidettes	14	9	5	0	304	265	39	17
4	Leigh Miners Rangers	15	8	7	0	384	236	148	15
5	Hull FC	14	7	7	0	211	252	-41	14
6	Barrow	14	6	8	0	255	373	-118	11
7	Widnes Vikings	14	4	10	0	216	420	-204	8
8	Wigan St Patricks	14	0	14	0	74	432	-358	-4
Deductions: Barrow: 1 point for forfeit; Leigh Miners Rangers: 1 point for forfeit; Oulton Raidettes: 1 point for forfeit; Wigan St Patricks: 4 point for four forfeits

=== 2018 play-offs ===
Semi-finals
1	Wakefield Trinity	4
4	Leigh Miners Rangers	8
2	Stanningley	38
Hull F.C.	12

Final
Stanningley	20
Leigh Miners Rangers	12

Source: (Note: It was initially reported that Stanningley would play Oulton Raidettes in the semi-final. It was later confirmed that Stanningley would play Hull F.C.)

== 2019 season ==
Warrington Wolves defeated Barrow Island 40–4 in the Grand Final. Warrington and Huddersfield Giants were accepted into the Super League.

POS	CLUB	P	W	L	D	PF	PA	DIFF	PTS
1	Warrington Wolves (C)	16	15	1	0	648	92	556	30
2	Barrow	16	12	3	1	325	246	79	25
3	Stanningley	15	9	5	1	330	190	140	19
4	Huddersfield Giants	15	6	9	0	224	328	-104	12
5	Widnes Vikings	14	5	8	1	114	259	-145	11
6	Leigh Miners Rangers Ladies	14	3	9	2	166	280	-114	8
7	Oulton Raidettes	14	3	9	2	114	358	-244	7
8	Hull FC	14	2	11	1	160	328	-168	3
Deductions: Hull FC: 2 point for two forfeits; Oulton Raidettes: 1 point for forfeit

=== 2019 play-offs ===
Semi-finals
1	Warrington Wolves	36
4	Huddersfield Giants	4
2	Barrow	14
3	Stanningley	12

Final
Warrington Wolves	40
Barrow	4

== 2020 season ==
Cancelled due to the COVID-19 pandemic.

== 2021 season ==
Leigh Miners Rangers defeated Barrow Raiders 10–6 in the Grand Final. Barrow and Leigh joined the Super League in 2022.

POS	CLUB	P	W	L	D	PF	PA	DIFF	DIFF%	WP%	PTS
1	Leigh Miners Rangers Ladies (C)	14	10	2	2	292	116	251.72	251.72	78.57	22
2	Barrow Raiders Ladies	14	9	4	1	312	160	195.00	195.00	67.86	19
3	Widnes Vikings	12	7	4	1	220	146	150.68	150.68	62.50	15
4	Stanningley	13	6	6	1	204	190	107.37	107.37	50.00	13
5	Oulton Raidettes	11	4	6	1	128	178	71.91	71.91	40.91	9
6	Hull FC	10	3	7	0	136	198	68.69	68.69	30.00	6
7	Halifax Panthers	12	1	11	0	108	412	26.21	26.21	8.33	2
8	Keighley Cougars	0	0	0	0	0	0	0.00	0.00	0.00	0

=== 2021 play-offs ===
Semi-finals
1	Leigh Miners Rangers	36
4	Stanningley	6
2	Barrow Raiders	16
3	Widnes Vikings	6

Final
Leigh Miners Rangers	10
Barrow Raiders	6

== 2022 season ==
Oulton Raidettes defeated Salford Red Devils 33–14 in the Grand Final. Salford replaced Wakefield Trinity in the 2023 Super League.

POS	CLUB	P	W	L	D	PF	PA	DIFF	PTS
1	Salford Red Devils	15	14	1	0	542	136	406	28
2	Oulton Raidettes (C)	14	12	1	1	403	152	251	25
3	Warrington Wolves Lunas	15	10	4	1	390	229	161	21
4	Stanningley	14	6	8	0	334	268	66	12
5	Hull KR	15	6	9	0	310	410	-100	12
6	Dewsbury Moor Ladies	13	4	9	0	256	354	-98	8
7	Hull FC	14	2	12	0	144	416	-272	4
8	Widnes Vikings	14	2	12	0	146	560	-414	4

== 2023 season ==
Hull KR defeated Oulton Raidettes 30–16 in the Grand Final.

POS	CLUB	P	W	L	D	PF	PA	DIFF	PTS
1	Hull KR (C)	20	18	2	0	682	202	480	36
2	Oulton Raidettes	20	16	4	0	604	244	360	31
3	Dewsbury Moor Ladies	19	15	4	0	512	226	286	30
4	Stanningley	19	13	6	0	540	244	296	26
5	Sheffield Eagles	18	11	7	0	512	298	214	22
6	Hull FC	18	6	11	1	298	362	-64	11
7	Widnes Vikings	18	4	12	2	222	468	-246	8
8	Swinton Lionesses	18	4	13	1	222	550	-328	7
9	Wakefield Trinity	18	1	17	0	68	932	-864	-1
10	Warrington Wolves Lunas	18	3	15	0	242	376	-134	-3
Deductions: Wakefield Trinity: 3 points for three forfeits; Hull FC: 2 point for two forfeits; Oulton Raidettes: 1 point for forfeit; Widnes Vikings: 2 point for two forfeits; Swinton Lionesses: 2 point for two forfeits; Warrington Wolves Lunas: 9 point for nine forfeits
