= 2015 Coventry Bears season =

- League 1 Rank: 12th
- Challenge Cup: Round Three
- League 1 Cup: Round 1
- 2015 record: Wins: 5; draws: 0; losses: 17

Team information
- Coach: Tom Tsang
- Stadium: Butts Park Arena
- Avg. attendance: 458 (League 1 Only)
- High attendance: 721 (vs. Oxford, 3 April)
- Low attendance: 200 (vs. South Wales Scorpions, 16 August)
← N/A	List of seasons	2016 →

In the 2015 Season Coventry Bears competed in the RFL League 1 and was the first time in the club's history that they competed in the professional leagues of rugby league. Although they won just 5 league matches in their debut season, it was in many ways a successful start to life in the professional leagues with the club attracting an average attendance of 458 and being awarded the League 1 Project of the Year.

== Results ==
Competition	Date	Round	H/A	Opponent	Result	Score	Lineup	Subs	Tries	Goals	Field Goals	Att	
League 1 Cup	1/3/15	1	A	Oldham	Lost	42-6	1. Troy Brophy, 20. Jamahl Hunte, 21. Stephen Coleman, 4. Eddie Medforth, 28. Andy Winfield, 18. Dan Poulton, 7. Cameron Boulter, 27. James Geurtjens, 9. Alex Brown, 10. John Aldred, 29. Liam Thompson, 12. Chris Barratt, 13. Simon Phillips	6. Billy Sheen, 8. Ben Tyers, 17. Alex Calvert, 26. Matt Cooper	Tyers (26)	Coleman 1/1	N/A	291	-
Challenge Cup	8/3/15	3	A	Oldham	Lost	46-6	6. Billy Sheen, 20. Jamahl Hunte, 21. Stephen Coleman, 4. Eddie Medforth, 1. Troy Brophy, 13. Simon Phillips, 18. Dan Poulton, 27. James Geurtjens, 9. Alex Brown, 10. John Aldred, 29. Liam Thompson, 12. Chris Barratt, 17. Alex Calvert	8. Ben Tyers, 26. Matt Cooper, 39. Rob Meadows, 3. Nick Taylor	Cooper (44)	Coleman 1/1	N/A	256	-
League 1	8/3/15	1	H	Oxford RLFC	Won	32-10	1. Troy Brophy, 37. Josh Guzdek, 4. Eddie Medforth, 21. Stephen Coleman, 20. Jamahl Hunte, 6. Billy Sheen, 39. Matthew Marsh, 27. James Guertjens, 9. Alex Brown, 26. Matt Cooper, 29. Liam Thompson, 12. Chris Barratt, 13. Simon Phillips	40. Connor Robinson, 38. Tom Hall, Alex Calvert, 3. Nick Taylor	Sheen (3), Cooper (12), Medforth (17,80), Guzdek (20), Brophy (70)	Coleman 4/6	N/A	721	-
League 1	12/4/15	2	A	Oldham	Lost	38-10	1. Troy Brophy, 37. Josh Guzdek, 4. Eddie Medforth, 30. Dan Parker, 20. Jamahl Hunte, 6. Billy Sheen, 39. Matthew Marsh, 27. James Guertjens, 9. Alex Brown, 38. Tom Hall, 29. Liam Thompson, 12. Chris Barratt, 13. Simon Phillips	21. Stephen Coleman, 26. Matt Cooper, 50. Matt Reid, 40. Connor Robinson	Reid (53), Guzdek (57)	Coleman 1/2	N/A	322	-
League 1	19/4/15	3	H	Hemel	Won	52-16	37. Josh Guzdek, 20. Jamahl Hunte, 30. Dan Parker, 4. Eddie Medforth, 1. Troy Brophy, 6. Billy Sheen, 39. Matthew Marsh, 27. James Geurtjens, 40. Connor Robinson, 38. Tom Hall, 12. Chris Barratt, 29. Liam Thompson, 13. Simon Phillips	16. Alex Beddows, 26. Matt Cooper, 21. Stephen Coleman, 50. Matt Reid	Hughes (49), Hunte (77)	Coleman 1/2	N/A	425	-
League 1	26/4/15	4	A	York	Lost	42-10	37. Josh Guzdek, 20. Jamahl Hunte, 30. Dan Parker, 4. Eddie Medforth, 41. Reece Chapman-Carry, 6. Billy Sheen, 7. Cameron Boulter, 27. James Geurtjens, 9. Alex Brown, 38. Tom Hall, 29. Liam Thompson, 12. Chris Barratt, 13. Simon Phillips	24. Richard Hughes, 50. Matt Reid, 26. Matt Cooper, 21. Stephen Coleman	Hughes (49), Hunte (77)	Coleman 1/2	N/A	498	-
League 1	3/5/15	5	H	Rochdale	Lost	10-35	7. Cameron Boulter, 42. Dan Rundle, 4. Eddie Medforth, 13. Simon Phillips, 41. Reece Chapman-Carry, 30. Dan Parker, 18. Dan Poulton, 27. James Geurtjens, 9. Alex Brown, 38. Tom Hall, 50. Matt Reid, 12. Chris Barratt, 21. Stephen Coleman	24. Richard Hughes, 26. Matt Cooper, 17. Alex Calvert, 32. Kenneth Kelliher	Parker (8), Boulter (74)	Coleman 1/2	N/A	496	-
League 1	10/5/15	6	A	Keighley	Lost	52-10	7. Cameron Boulter, 42. Dan Rundle, 21. Stephen Coleman, 4. Eddie Medforth, 41. Reece Chapman-Carry, 18. Dan Poulton, 30. Dan Parker, 27. James Geurtjens, 24. Richard Hughes, 38. Tom Hall, 12. Chris Barratt, 29. Liam Thompson, 50. Matt Reid	: 9. Alex Brown, 16. Alex Beddows, 26. Matt Cooper, 32. Kenneth Kelliher	Medforth (27,39)	Coleman 1/2	N/A	4,066	-
League 1	16/5/15	7	A	Gloucestershire All Golds	Lost	66-6	7. Cameron Boulter, 20. Jamahl Hunte, 5. Ben Parry, 13. Simon Phillips, 42. Dan Rundle, 6. Billy Sheen, 30. Dan Parker, 27. James Geurtjens, 24. Richard Hughes, 10. John Aldred, 12. Chris Barratt, 29. Liam Thompson, 50. Matt Reid	14. Dylan Bale, 26. Matt Cooper, 38. Tom Hall, 21. Stephen Coleman	Hunte (30)	Parker 1/1	N/A	308	-
League 1	31/5/15	8	H	Barrow	Lost	4-22	7. Cameron Boulter, 41. Reece Chapman-Carry, 5. Ben Parry, 13. Simon Phillips, 20. Jamahl Hunte, 30. Dan Parker, 6. Billy Sheen, 27. James Geurtjens, 24. Richard Hughes, 46. Jack Francis, 29. Liam Thompson, 12. Chris Barratt, 26. Matt Cooper	14. Dylan Bale, 50. Morgan Evans, 38. Tom Hall, 3. Nick Taylor	Hunte (7)	Parker 0/1	N/A	552	-
League 1	7/6/15	9	A	London Skolars	Won	20-46	28. Andy Winfield, 20. Jamahl Hunte, 5. Ben Parry, 13. Simon Phillips, 41. Reece Chapman-Carry, 7. Cameron Boutler, 30. Dan Parker, 27. James Geurtjens, 24. Richard Hughes, 46. Jack Francis, 12. Chris Barratt, 29. Liam Thompson, 26. Matt Cooper	21. Stephen Coleman, 50. Motgan Evans, 38. Tom Hall, 32. Kenneth Kelliher	Hughes (16), Parry (19), Hunte (28), Cooper (30), Parker (35,40), Winfield (53), Chapman-Carry (73)	Parker 7/8	N/A	259	-
League 1	14/6/15	10	H	Swinton	Lost	8-78	28. Andy Winfield, 41. Reece Chapman-Carry, 5. Ben Parry, 21. Stephen Coleman, 20. Jamahl Hunte, 7. Cameron Boutler, 30. Dan Parker, 27. James Geurtjens, 24. Richard Hughes, 26. Matt Cooper, 29. Liam Thompson, 12. Chris Barratt, 32. Kenneth Kelliher	6. Billy Sheen, 46. Jack Francis, 38. Tom Hall, 3. Nick Taylor	Hunte (58), Sheen (66)	Coleman 0/1, Parker 0/1	N/A	454	-
League 1	21/6/15	11	A	South Wales Scorpions	Won	14-42	28. Andy Winfield, 20. Jamahl Hunte, 30. Dan Parker, 21. Stephen Coleman, 41. Reece Chapman-Carry, 6. Billy Sheen, 7. Cameron Boutler, 27. James Geurtjens, 24. Richard Hughes, 46. Jack Francis, 32. Kenneth Kelliher, 12. Chris Barratt, 26. Matt Cooper	29. Liam Thompson, 38. Tom Hall, Andy Unsworth, 50. Morgan Evans	Sheen (12,34), Hughes (16), Hunte (28), Hall (39), Kelliher (56), Francis (71), Evans (80)	Coleman 3/6, Parker 2/2	N/A	307	-
League 1	27/6/15	12	A	Oxford RLFC	Lost	24-20	28. Andy Winfield, 20. Jamahl Hunte, 21. Stephen Coleman, 5. Ben Parry, 45. Jason Bass, 30. Dan Parker, 7. Cameron Boutler, 27. James Geurtjens, 24. Richard Hughes, 46. Jack Francis, 32. Kenneth Kelliher, 12. Chris Barratt, 26. Matt Cooper	15. Andy Unsworth, 31. Morgan Evans, 29. Liam Thompson, 14. Dylan Bale	Coleman (3), Thompson (30), Parry (44)	Parker 4/4	N/A	502	-
League 1	5/7/15	13	H	North Wales Crusaders	Lost	4-50	28. Andy Winfield, 2. Chris Dixon, 5. Ben Parry, 21. Stephen Coleman, 45. Jason Bass, 30. Dan Parker, 7. Cameron Boutler, 27. James Geurtjens, 24. Richard Hughes, 16. Alex Beddows, 32. Kenneth Killiher, 12. Chris Barratt, 26. Matt Cooper	29. Liam Thompson, 15. Andy Unsworth, 50. Morgan Evans, 17. Jack Morrison	Cooper (42)	Parker 0/1	N/A	467	-
League 1	12/7/15	14	H	Keighley	Lost	10-42	28. Andy Winfield, 2. Chris Dixon, 30. Dan Parker, 5. Ben Parry, 45. Jason Bass, 39. Joel James, 7. Cameron Boutler, 46. Jack Francis, 24. Richard Hughes, 17. Jack Morrison, 29. Liam Thompson, 12. Chris Barratt, 26. Matt Cooper	3. Nick Taylor, 14. Dylan Bale, 16. Alex Beddows, 38. Tom Hall	Morrison (12), Bass (54)	Parker 1/2	N/A	441	-
League 1	19/7/15	15	A	Rochdale	Lost	50-22	28. Andy Winfield, 20. Jamahl Hunte, 3. Nick Taylor, 13. Simon Phillips, 45. Jason Bass, 42. Joel James, 30. Dan Parker, 35. Jack Morrison, 24. Richard Hughes, 46. Jack Francis, 29. Liam Thompson, 12. Chris Barratt, 26. Matt Cooper	27. James Geurtjens, 21. Stephen Coleman, 38. Tom Hall, 14. Dylan Bale	Phillips (5), Hughes (24), Cooper (28,72)	Parker 3/5	N/A	315	-
League 1	26/7/15	16	A	Hemel	Lost	16-12	7. Cameron Boutler, 2. Chris Dixon, 45. Jason Bass, 3. Nick Taylor, 20. Jamahl Hunte, 30. Dan Parker, 42. Joel James, 17. Jack Morrison, 24. Richard Hughes, 27. James Geurtjens, 29. Liam Thompson, 12. Chris Barratt, 26. Matt Cooper	9. Alex Brown, 38. Tom Hall, 46. Jack Francis, 32. Kenneth Kelliher	Barratt (36), Parker (60)	Parker 2/2	N/A	117	-
League 1	2/8/15	17	H	York	Lost	10-38	45. Jason Bass, 49. Elliot Holton, 13. Simon Phillips, 3. Nick Taylor, 2. Chris Dixon, 39. Dan Price, 42. Joel James, 17. Jack Morrison, 24. Richard Hughes, 34. Andy Unsworth, 26. Matt Cooper, 12. Chris Barratt, 30. Dan Parker	38. Tom Hall, 29. Liam Thompson, 14. Dylan Bale, 50. Morgan Evans	James (70), Parker (75)	Parker 1/2	N/A	442	-
League 1	8/8/15	18	A	Barrow	Lost	44-22	45. Jason Bass, 20. Jamahl Hunte, 30. Dan Parker, 13. Simon Phillips, 49. Elliot Holton, 40. Dan Price, 42. Joel James, 35. Jack Morrison, 24. Richard Hughes, 34. Andy Unsworth, 29. Liam Thompson, 13. Chris Barratt, 26. Matt Cooper	38. Tom Hall, 3. Nick Taylor, 16. Alex Beddows, 46. Jack Francis	Hughes (14), Thompson (20), Hunte (25), Francis (38)	Parker 3/4	N/A	848	-
League 1	16/8/15	19	H	South Wales Scorpions	Won	44-18	28. Andy Winfield, 45. Jason Bass, 40. Jordan Harper, 30. Dan Parker, 20. Jamahl Hunte, 39. Dan Price, 7. Cameron Boulter, 17. Jack Morrison, 24. Richard Hughes, 16. Alex Beddows, 29. Liam Thompson, 12. Chris Barratt, 26. Matt Cooper	3. Nick Taylor, 38. Tom Hall, 34. Andy McGrory, 46. Jack Francis	Parker (9), Harper (13), Price (19), Hunte (22,29), Taylor (54), Hughes (57), Thompson (80)	Parker 6/8	N/A	200	-
League 1	23/8/15	20	A	Newcastle	Lost	24-16	28. Andy Winfield, 45. Jason Bass, 13. Simon Phillips, 40. Jordan Harper, 20. Jamahl Hunte, 39. Dan Price, 7. Cameron Boulter, 35. Jack Morrison, 24. Richard Hughes, 26. Matt Cooper, 29. Liam Thompson, 12. Chris Barratt, 30. Dan Parker	38. Tom Hall, 34. Andy Unsworth, 3. Nick Taylor, 46. Jack Francis	Hughes (28), Unsworth (33), Boulter (49)	Price 1/1, Parker 1/2	N/A	503	-
League 1	6/9/15	21	H	London Skolars	Lost	18-28	28. Andy Winfield, 45. Jason Bass, 5. Ben Parry, 13. Simon Phillips, 20. Jamahl Hunte, 40. Dan Price, 7. Cameron Boulter, 17. Jack Morrison, 24. Richard Hughes, 34. Andy Unsworth, 29. Liam Thompson, 12. Chris Barratt, 26. Matt Cooper	27. James Geurtjens, 50. Morgan Evans, 30. Dan Parker, 3. Nick Taylor	Barratt (29), Morrison (37), Hunte (44), Phillips (50)	Price 1/1, Parker 0/3	N/A	400	-
League 1	13/9/15	22	H	Gloucestershire All Golds	Lost	22-48	28. Andy Winfield, 45. Jason Bass, 30. Dan Parker, 5. Ben Parry, 20. Jamahl Hunte, 39. Dan Price, 7. Cameron Boulter, 17. Jack Morrison, 24. Richard Hughes, 26. Matt Cooper, 29. Liam Thompson, 12. Chris Barratt, 21. Stephen Coleman	11. David O’Connor, 27. James Geurtjens, 32. Kenneth Kelliher, 50. Morgan Evans	Hunte (9), Parry (14), Hughes (27), Parker (32)	Parker 3/4	N/A	441	-
