= 2016 Coventry Bears season =

- League 1 Rank: 11th
- League One Shield: 3rd
- Challenge Cup: Round Three
- League 1 Cup: Round 1

Team information
- Coach: Tom Tsang
- Stadium: Butts Park Arena
- Avg. attendance: 426
- High attendance: 1,097 (vs. Keighley, 8 May)
- Low attendance: 146 (vs. Gloucestershire All Golds, 21 February)
← 2015	List of seasons	2017 →

The 2016 Season saw Coventry Bears compete once again the RFL League 1, the third tier of professional rugby league in Britain, in only their second professional season. The Coventry Bears improved upon the previous season by claiming an 11th place position with 8 wins to their credit under their coach, Tom Tsang.

== Results ==
Competition	Date	Round	H/A	Opponent	Result	Score	Lineup	Subs	Tries	Goals	Field Goals	Att	
League 1 Cup	21/2/16	1	H	Gloucestershire All Golds	Lost	24-48	Dave Weston, Jamahl Hunte, Eddie Medforth, Jason Bass, Hayden Freeman, Craig White, Jay Lobwein, James Geurtjens, Richard Hughes, Jack Morrison, Liam Thompson, Matt Reid, Adam Saynor	Joel James, Jonathan Milizewski, Trae O'Sullivan, Chris Barratt	Bass (6), Medforth (10), Freeman (15,72), Hunte (78)	Weston 1/3, White 1/2	N/A	146	-
Challenge Cup	28/2/16	3	A	Keighley	Lost	54-28	Joel James, Ben Warrilow, Brett Barlow, Matt Reid, Hayden Freeman, 6. Charlie O'Mara, Jay Lobwein, Tommy Holland, James Redman, Elliot Liku, Elliot Holton, Chris Barratt, Jonathan Milizewski	Elliot Norman, Alex Beddows, Trae O'Sullivan, Adam Saynor	Holland (2), Warrilow (17), O'Mara (22), Lobwein (76), Milizewski (79)	James 4/5	N/A	421	-
League 1	5/3/16	1	A	Toulouse Olympique	Lost	54-6	Joel James, Jamahl Hunter, Eddie Medforth, Matt Reid, Hayden Freeman, Charlie O'Mara, Jay Lobwein, James Geurtjens, Richard Hughes, Jack Morrison, Liam Thompson, Chris Barratt, Jonathan Millizewski	James Redman, Elliot Liku, Tommy Holland, Adam Saynor	Reid (31)	James 1/1	N/A	2,284	-
League 1	13/3/16	2	H	Rochdale	Lost	16-58	Ben Warrilow, Jamahl Hunte, Eddie Medforth, Matt Reid, Hayden Freeman, James Redman, Jay Lobwein, Tommy Holland, Richard Hughes, Jack Morrison, Liam Thompson, Chris Barratt, Jonathan Milizewski	Craig White, Elliot Liku, James Geurtjens, Trae O'Sullivan	Hughes (57,77), Reid (66)	White 2/3	N/A	250	-
League 1	25/3/16	3	A	Gloucestershire All Golds	Won	28-29	Jason Bass, Jamahl Hunte, Eddie Medforth, Matt Reid, Hayden Freeman, James Redman, Joel James, Trae O'Sullivan, Jay Lobwein, Jack Morrison, Liam Thompson, Chris Barratt, Richard Hughes	Charlie O'Mara, Adam Saynor, James Geurtjens, Jonathan Milizewski	Morrison (22), Medforth (45), Freeman (60), Reid (64), Hughes (72)	James 4/5	James (79)	167	-
League 1	10/4/16	4	H	Barrow	Lost	0-38	Joel James, Jamahl Hunte, Eddie Medforth, Matt Reid, Jason Bass, Craig White, James Redman, Chris Barratt, Jay Lobwein, Jack Morrison, Liam Thompson, Jonathan Milizewski, Richard Hughes	Charlie O'Mara, James Geurtjens, Adam Saynor, Grant Beecham	N/A	N/A	N/A	425	-
League 1	23/4/16	6	A	London Skolars	Lost	52-20	Joel James, Ben Warrilow, Eddie Medforth, Matt Reid, Jason Bass, Craig White, James Redman, James Geurtjens, Jay Lobwein, Jack Morrison, Liam Thompson, Chris Barratt, Richard Hughes	Charlie O'Mara, Adam Saynor, Jonathan Milizewski, Grant Beecham	Barratt (16), Hughes (57), Beecham (72), O'Mara (75)	James 2/2, White 0/2	N/A	365	-
League 1	8/5/16	7	H	Keighley	Lost	16-36	Charlie O'Mara, Ben Warrilow, Eddie Medforth, Matt Reid, Jason Bass, James Redman, Joel James, Alex Beddows, Jay Lobwein, Jack Morrison, Liam Thompson, Chris Barratt, Richard Hughes	James Geurtjens, Grant Beecham, Jonathan Milizewski, Trae O'Sullivan	Geurtjens (32), Beecham (50), Barratt (54)	James 2/3	N/A	1,097	-
League 1	14/5/16	8	H	Doncaster	Lost	20-32	Charlie O'Mara, Hayden Freeman, Eddie Medforth, Jonathan Milizewski, Jason Bass, Joel James, James Redman, Alex Beddows, Jay Lobwein, Jack Morrison, Liam Thompson, Chris Barratt, Richard Hughes	James Geurtjens, Grant Beecham, Joe Batchelor, Trae O'Sullivan	Freeman (18), Medforth (44,71), O'Mara (59)	James 2/4	N/A	373	-
League 1	22/5/16	9	A	Hemel	Won	14-50	Charlie O'Mara, Ben Warrilow, Eddie Medforth, Jonathan Milizewski, Jason Bass, Joel James, James Redman, James Geurtjens, Jay Lobwein, Alex Beddows, Liam Thompson, Grant Beecham, Jack Morrison	Brad Brennan, Chris Barratt, Joe Batchelor, Trae O'Sullivan	Millizewski (23,71,77), Barratt (31), Lobwein (34), Brennan (43), O'Mara (47,57,80), Thompson (68)	James 5/10	N/A	149	-
League 1	1/6/16	5	A	York	Lost	32-14	Jason Bass, Harry Chapman, Eddie Medforth, Joe Batchelor, Hayden Freeman, Joel James, James Redman, Jack Morrison, Elliot Norman, Alex Beddows, Liam Thompson, Chris Barratt, Grant Beecham	Brad Brennan, Trae O'Sullivan, Elliot Holton, Dan Price	Redman (9), Chapman (13), Bass (78)	James 1/3	N/A	451	-
League 1	11/6/16	11	H	Oxford	Won	48-10	Dan Price, Jonathan Milizewski, Matt Reid, Eddie Medforth, Hayden Freeman, Joel James, James Redman, James Geurtjens, Jay Lobwein, Jack Morrison, Liam Thompson, Chris Barratt, Grant Beecham	Trae O'Sullivan, Brad Brennan, Joe Batchelor, Richard Hughes	James (8), Morrison (11), Medforth (17,40), Brennan (29), Thompson (44), Milizewski (47), Batchelor (53), Barratt (75)	James 6/9	N/A	444	-
League 1	19/6/16	12	A	Hunslet	Lost	38-18	Charlie O'Mara, Dan Price, Matt Reid, Eddie Medforth, Jonathan Milizewski, Joel James, James Redman, Alex Beddows, Jay Lobwein, Jack Morrison, Liam Thompson, Chris Barratt, Grant Beecham	Trae O'Sullivan, James Geurtjens, Joe Batchelor, Richard Hughes	Lobwein (7), Batchelor (37), Reid (70)	James 3/3	N/A	446	-
League 1	25/6/16	13	H	Newcastle	Lost	14-32	Charlie O'Mara, Jason Bass, Matt Reid, Eddie Medforth, Jonathan Milizewski, Joel James, James Redman, Alex Beddows, Jay Lobwein, Jack Morrison, Liam Thompson, Grant Beecham, Richard Hughes	Chris Barratt, Dan Price, Joe Batchelor, Trae O'Sullivan	Beecham (10), O'Mara (22), Medforth (30)	James 1/3	N/A	266	-
League 1	3/7/16	14	A	North Wales Crusaders	Drawn	20-20	Charlie O'Mara, Jason Bass, Eddie Medforth, Matt Reid, Jonathan Milizewski, Joel James, James Redman, Alex Beddows, Jay Lobwein, Jack Morrison, Liam Thompson, Chris Barratt, Grant Beecham	Dan Price, Andy Unsworth, John Aldred, Trae O'Sullivan	Reid (2), Bass (8), Beddows (60), Morrison (79)	James 2/4	N/A	359	-
League 1	9/7/16	15	H	South Wales Scorpions	Won	18-16	Charlie O'Mara, Jonathan Milizewski, Eddie Medforth, Matt Reid, Jason Bass, Dan Price, Joel James, Alex Beddows, Jay Lobwein, Jack Morrison, Liam Thompson, Chris Barratt, Grant Beecham	Andy Unsworth, Trae O'Sullivan, John Aldred, Richard Hughes	Hughes (45,49), Morrison (59)	James 3/3, Price 0/1	N/A	545	-
League 1 Shield	23/7/16	1	H	Oxford RLFC	Won	48-6	Charlie O'Mara, Jonathan Milizewski, Eddie Medforth, Matt Reid, Jason Bass, Dan Price, Joel James, Alex Beddows, Richard Hughes, Jack Morrison, Joe Batchelor, Chris Barratt, Grant Beecham	Jay Lobwein, James Geurtjens, Andy Unsworth, Trae O'Sullivan	O'Mara (9), Hughes (18,42), Medforth (28,63,66), Reid (51), Beddows (57), Morrison (60)	James 6/9	N/A	253	-
League 1 Shield	6/8/16	3	H	South Wales Scorpions	Lost	14-18	Charlie O'Mara, Jonathan Milizewski, Eddie Medforth, Matt Reid, Jason Bass, Joe Batchelor, Joel James, Alex Beddows, Richard Hughes, Jack Morrison, Liam Thompson, Chris Barratt, Grant Beecham	Jay Lobwein, James Geurtjens, Andy Unsworth, Trae O'Sullivan	Bass (2), Batchelor (63)	James 3/3	N/A	497	-
League 1 Shield	14/8/16	4	A	North Wales Crusaders	Won	28-30	Jason Bass, Jonathan Milizewski, Eddie Medforth, Matt Reid, Jamahl Hunte, Joe Batchelor, Joel James, Alex Beddows, Richard Hughes, Jack Morrison, Liam Thompson, Chris Barratt, Grant Beecham	Jay Lobwein, James Geurtjens, Andy Unsworth, Trae O'Sullivan	Beecham (17), Batchelor (36), Lobwein (49), Hunte (56), Hughes (73)	James 5/6	N/A	297	-
League 1 Shield	21/8/16	5	H	Gloucestershire All Golds	Won	33-20	Jason Bass, Hayden Freeman, Jonathan Milizewski, Grant Beecham, Jamahl Hunte, Dan Price, Joel James, Alex Beddows, Jay Lobwein, Trae O'Sullivan, Andy Unsworth, Chris Barratt, Jack Morrison	Harry Chapman, James Geurtjens, John Aldred, Dylan Bale	Freeman (2), Price (31,75), Hunte (34), Lobwein (37), Bass (54)	James 4/6	James (72)	392	-
League 1 Shield	3/9/16	6	A	Newcastle	Lost	46-10	Charlie O'Mara, Jason Bass, Eddie Medforth, Jonathan Milizewski, Jamahl Hunte, Dan Price, Joel James, Alex Beddows, Jay Lobwein, Trae O'Sullivan, Grant Beecham, Chris Barratt, Jack Morrison	Richard Hughes, James Geurtjens, Joe Batchelor, John Aldred	Medforth (31), Morrison (66)	James 1/2	N/A	456	-
League 1 Shield	10/9/16	7	A	Hemel	Won	12-22	Charlie O'Mara, Hayden Freeman, Jason Bass, Jonathan Milizewski, Jamahl Hunte, Dan Price, Joel James, Alex Beddows, Jay Lobwein, Jack Morrison, Joe Batchelor, Chris Barratt, Grant Beecham	Dylan Bale, Trae O'Sullivan, James Geurtjens	Morrison (4), Milizewski (36), Hunte (66), Price (71)	James 3/4	N/A	307	-
