= Oulton Raidettes =

English women's rugby league club

Club information
- Full name: Oulton Raidettes Women's Rugby League Club
- Nickname: Oulton Raidettes
- Founded: March 2012

Current details
- Ground: Oulton Sports Pavilion, Oulton Green, Leeds
- Competition: RFL Women's National Championship
- 2026: 6th

The Oulton Raidettes Women's Rugby League Club are a women's rugby league football team based in Leeds, West Yorkshire. They were founded in 2012 and have affiliations with the Oulton Raiders. As of 2025, they play in the National Championship.

== History ==
In 2012, the team played in the Yorkshire and North East Division and made their first appearance in the Women's Challenge Cup where they played Wigan St Patricks in the first round. The league system was restructured several times in the following seasons with Oulton competing in Division One in 2013 and, from 2015, in the Premier Division which was the top tier of the RFL Women's Rugby League. In 2016 and 2017, before the group format was introduced to the Challenge Cup, Oulton reached the quarter-finals of the competition. In 2017, Oulton competed in the Championship and reached the Grand Final in the first season of the competition.

In April 2022, Oulton defeated Wakefield Trinity 14–12 in their final group match to progress to the quarter-finals of the Challenge Cup. In October 2022, Oulton defeated the Salford Red Devils 33–14 in the Championship Grand Final, but declined promotion to the 2023 Super League. In 2023, Oulton reached the Championship Grand Final again, but lost 30–16 to Hull Kingston Rovers. In January 2024, following the restructuring of the women's league pyramid, it was announced that Oulton would be in the Northern Women's Championship. They finished the season in fourth place to qualify for the play-offs, but forfeited their semi-final match due to players having other commitments, including several of them being in France as part of England Rugby League's Diploma in Sporting Excellence (DiSE) programme.

In July 2026, Oulton won the Challenge Plate by defeating Bradford Bulls 42–6 in the final.

== Results ==
Season	League									Play-offs	Challenge Cup	Other competitions		Ref.
Season	Division	P	W	D	L	F	A	Pts	Pos	Play-offs	Challenge Cup	Other competitions		Ref.
2012	Yorkshire and North East	12	Unknown					8	5th	Lost in Plate semi-finals	R1	Challenge Shield	R1	
2013	Division One	18	Unknown					16	8th	Did not qualify	R2	Challenge Shield	R1	
2014	Division One	Unknown									R2	—N/a		
2015	Premier	14	7	0	7	242	286	14	7th	Lost in Shield round 1	unknown	WRLA Challenge Cup	W	
2016	Premier	5	2	1	2	56	84	4	7th	—N/a	QF	WRLA Challenge Cup	W	
2016	Super Six (Group 2)	8	7	0	1	308	40	14	2nd	Lost in Final	QF	Yorkshire Cup	W	
2017	Championship	6	4	1	1	186	76	9	2nd	Lost in Grand Final	QF	Yorkshire Cup	RU	
2018	Championship	14	9	0	5	304	126	22	3rd	Did not compete (Note: It was initially reported that Oulton Raidettes were in the semi-finals but their place was taken by Hull F.C.)	PR	—N/a		
2019	Championship	14	3	2	9	114	358	7	7th	Did not qualify	R1	—N/a		
2020	Championship	Cancelled due to the COVID-19 pandemic												
2021	Championship	11	4	1	6	128	178	9	5th	Did not qualify	—N/a	—N/a		
2022	Championship	14	12	1	1	542	152	25	2nd	Won in Grand Final	QF	Nines	QR	
2023	Championship	18	15	0	3	568	208	29	3rd	Lost in Grand Final	GS	League Cup	QF	(Note: League tables on the RFL "Match Centre" include some results from play-off matches. In 2023, Oulton appear above Dewsbury Moor though they finished the regular season a point behind in third place.)
2024	Northern Championship	16	10	0	6	430	296	20	4th	Forfeited semi-finals	—N/a	—N/a		
2025	Northern Championship	10	3	0	7	128	224	5	9th	Did not qualify	—N/a	Challenge Shield	R2	
2026	National Championship	12	6	1	5	299	338	13	6th	Did not qualify	—N/a	Challenge Plate	W	
