= 2025 RFL Women's Championship =

- Teams: 11 (Northern); 6 (Midlands); 5 (Southern)
- Champions: Featherstone Rovers
- Runners-up: London Broncos

The 2025 RFL Women's Championship was the ninth season of the RFL Women's Championship and the second since its restructure and expansion to include teams from across the country. The 2025 competition saw the expansion of all three regional leagues and saw Cardiff Demons and London Broncos transferred to the Northern Championship from the Southern Champioinship.

The winner of the Northern Championship was expected to take part in a promotion play-off against the bottom team of the 2025 RFL Women's Super League. This was scheduled to be played on 5 October, however, a month earlier it was cancelled due to Warrington Wolves being unable to fulfil their remaining fixtures. Therefore, the winner of the Northern Championship earns promotion to the 2026 Super League subject to meeting the competition minimum standards. Featherstone Rovers defeated London Broncos 20–10 in the final of the Northern Championship.

== Teams ==
Clubs competing in the 2025 season
Northern	Midlands	Southern
Bradford Bulls; Cardiff Demons; Castleford Tigers; Featherstone Rovers; Hull FC; Hull Kingston Rovers; London Broncos; Oulton Raidettes; Salford Red Devils; Sheffield Eagles; Swinton Lionesses	Coventry Bears; Leamington Royals; Midlands Hurricanes; Nottingham Outlaws; Sheffield Eagles 'A'; Telford Raiders	Anglian Vipers; Army; ~~Bedford Tigers~~; Brentwood Eels; Bristol Golden Ferns; North Herts Crusaders

== Northern Championship ==
In December 2024, the RFL announced that the Northern Championship would be expanded with Cardiff Demons and London Broncos transferring from the Southern Championship. Hull FC and Swinton Lionesses moving up from League One in the place of Stanningley would have resulted in a 12-team competition. However, the withdrawal of Dewsbury Moor meant that only 11 teams started the season and therefore no team was relegated at the end of the season.

The 2025 RFL Northern Championship began on 23 March and the regular season concluded on 31 August. The play-offs were originally intended to include a relegation/promotion play-off between the winner of the Northern Women's Championship and the last-placed team of the 2025 Super League. However, as Warrington Wolves were unable to fulfil their remaining Super League fixtures of the season, the RFL announced on 5 September that winner of the Northern Championship would be directly promoted to the 2026 Super League with Warrington facing an enforced relegation subject to the Championship side meeting the required competition standards. On 28 September, Featherstone Rovers defeated the league leaders, London Broncos, 20-10 in the Grand Final.

=== Table ===
Pos	Team	Pld	W	D	L	PF	PA	PD	Pts	
1	London Broncos	10	9	1	0	402	94	+308	19	Advance to semi-finals
2	Featherstone Rovers	10	9	0	1	364	56	+308	18	Advance to semi-finals
3	Cardiff Demons	10	7	1	2	290	122	+168	15	Advance to semi-finals
4	Salford Red Devils	10	7	0	3	234	140	+94	14	Advance to semi-finals
5	Swinton Lionesses	10	7	0	3	228	140	+88	14	
6	Hull Kingston Rovers	10	5	0	5	206	212	−6	10	
7	Sheffield Eagles	10	3	0	7	126	228	−102	6	
8	Hull FC	10	3	0	7	100	260	−160	6	
9	Oulton Raidettes	10	3	0	7	128	224	−96	5 (Note: Deducted 1 point for forfeited fixture)	
10	Bradford Bulls	10	1	0	9	50	336	−286	2	
11	Castleford Tigers	10	0	0	10	88	404	−316	0	

=== Results ===
Home \ Away	LON	FEV	CAR	SAL	SWI	HKR	SHE	HUL	OUL	BRA	CAS
London Broncos	—	40–24; 30 Mar	22–22; 23 Mar	—	—	—	—	—	34–10; 20 Jul	48–0; 27 Jul	84–6; 1 Jun
Featherstone Rovers	—	—	22–0; 15 Jun	16–6; 1 Jun	30–0; 17 Aug	—	—	44–0; 23 Mar	—	—	62–0; 29 Jun
Cardiff Demons	—	—	—	18–22; 31 Aug	30–10; 1 Jun	32–24; 18 May	38–6; 22 Jun	48–0; 27 Jul	—	—	—
Salford Red Devils	6–26; 29 Jun	—	—	—	—	26–16; 27 Jul	12–4; 23 Mar	20–14; 22 Jun	—	72–6; 13 Jul	—
Swinton Lionesses	6–34; 25 May	—	—	14–0; 15 Jun	—	32–14; 24 Aug	—	—	36–4; 27 Jul	34–6; 23 Mar	—
Hull Kingston Rovers	12–56; 15 Jun	4–30; 20 Jul	—	—	—	—	26–6; 30 Mar	—	—	32–6; 3 Aug	52–10; 9 Aug
Sheffield Eagles	8–22; 17 Aug	0–44; 31 Aug	—	—	10–18; 20 Jul	—	—	26–14; 29 Jun	10–26; 1 Jun	—	—
Hull FC	0–36; 31 Aug	—	—	—	12–38; 30 Mar	4–12; 1 Jun	—	—	14–12; 15 Jun	20–6; 17 Aug	—
Oulton Raidettes	—	6–28; 18 May	0–48; 29 Jun	20–22; 17 Aug	—	10–14; 22 Jun	—	—	—	—	16–8; 23 Mar
Bradford Bulls	—	0–64; 22 Jun	0–14; 20 Jul	—	—	—	8–24; 15 Jun	—	10–24; 25 May	—	8–4; 31 Aug
Castleford Tigers	—	—	16–40; 30 Mar	6–48; 20 Jul	0–40; 22 Jun	—	20–32; 27 Jul	18–22; 18 May	—	—	—

Legend: Blue = home team win; Yellow = draw; Red = away team win.

=== Play-offs ===
Semi-finals
1	London Broncos	22
4	Salford Red Devils	10
2	Featherstone Rovers	20
3	Cardiff Demons	14

Championship Final
1	London Broncos	10
2	Featherstone Rovers	20

== Southern Championship ==
The Southern Championship expanded to six teams with Anglian Vipers, Brentwood Eels, Bristol Golden Ferns and North Herts Crusaders joining the competition. The season began on 1 June in Hemel Hempstead with the Golden Ferns defeating the Vipers and the Army defeating Brentwood. Bedford Tigers were unable to fulfil any of their fixtures which were initially recorded as walkovers before the team was removed from the final league table. The finals day took place on 3 August. The Army won the title by defeating the Golden Ferns 28–24 in the Grand Final. The match was preceded by a series of matches played by the non-finalists.

Pos	Team	Pld	W	D	L	PF	PA	PD	Pts	ARM	BGF	BRE	NHC	ANG
1	Army	4	4	0	0	208	30	+178	8	—	—	—	56–0	72–0
2	Bristol Golden Ferns	4	3	0	1	188	98	+90	6	26–46	—	—	—	—
3	Brentwood Eels	4	1	1	2	52	102	−50	3	4–34	8–44	—	C–C (Note: Recorded in league table as a 0–0 draw)	—
4	North Herts Crusaders	4	1	1	2	54	120	−66	3	—	16–52	—	—	38–12
5	Anglian Vipers	4	0	0	4	64	216	−152	0	—	28–66	24–40	—	—

== Midlands Championship ==
The Midlands Championship expanded to six teams with the addition of Midlands Hurricanes and Sheffield Eagles 'A', but retained the festival format used in 2024. Each team played ten games across the six rounds of the competition which began on 15 June and concluded on 3 August. The top two teams qualified for the grand final on 16 August in which Telford Raiders defeated Leamington Royals.

=== Table and results ===
Pos	Team	Pld	W	D	L	PF	PA	PD	Pts	TEL	LEA	NOT	COV	MID	SHE
1	Telford Raiders	10	8	0	2	250	40	+210	16	—	4–18	36–0	28–0	24–0	30–0
2	Leamington Royals	10	6	0	4	142	94	+48	12	0–24	—	0–18	10–14	24–4	24–0
3	Nottingham Outlaws	10	5	1	4	130	100	+30	11	18–14	6–10	—	34–0	8–12	24–0
4	Coventry Bears	10	4	1	5	86	110	−24	9	4–18	8–4	0–6	—	4–4	4–6
5	Midlands Hurricanes	10	3	1	6	86	166	−80	7	0–24	30–0	24–0	0–24	—	36–10
6	Sheffield Eagles 'A'	10	2	1	7	54	238	−184	5	0–48	4–34	10–10	0–28	24–0	—
