= RFL Women's Championship =

Women's rugby league competition in Great Britain

Women's Championship
- Current season, competition or edition: 2026 RFL Women's National Championship
- Sport: Rugby league
- Founded: 2017; 9 years ago
- No. of teams: 23
- Country: England; Scotland; Wales
- Level on pyramid: 2
- Promotion to: Women’s Super League
- Domestic cups: Women's Challenge Cup; Women's Challenge Shield

The RFL Women's Championship (originally proposed as the RFL Women's Regional Super League) is a rugby league competition for women's rugby league clubs in Great Britain. The competition is the second tier competition in the British rugby league system with competition winners having the possibility of promotion to the Women’s Super League.

== History ==
=== Foundations ===
Prior to 2024, the RFL Women's Championship acted like the men's competition, a single national competition below the Super League. The competition was founded in 2017, the same year as the RFL Women's Super League, following the abolition of its predecessor competition, the RFL Women's Rugby League. However due to the geographical distribution of rugby league club in Great Britain, all Championship clubs were located in Northern England. In light of the growth of popularity in the women's game, especially outside of the heartlands, the expanded Championship aimed to grow women's rugby league outside of the heartland and provide routes for non-heartlands clubs to enter the Super League.

=== Proposed expansion and 2023 "Super Leagues" ===
The original plan for the competition had teams divided into four geographical groups with each group having a maximum of eight teams as the competition grows. Winners of each group enter a playoff draw with the winners being the season's champion. The champion would also enter a promotion play-off with the last placed team in the Super League for possible promotion, similar to the Million Pound Game.

The four tournaments regions were:

- North: Scotland, Cumberland, North East England.
- Roses: North West England, Yorkshire, Humberside. (Rugby League Heartlands).
- Midlands: North Wales, Mid Wales, Midlands.
- South: South Wales, Southern England.

The Roses region would inherit teams from the Super League and existing Championship whilst the South region would be a successor competition to the Super League South. This had been launched in 2021 with six teams: Army RL, Bedford Tigers, Cardiff Demons, Cornish Rebels, Golden Ferns and London Broncos. Despite plans for expansion the league remained at six teams when Oxford Cavaliers joined in 2022 as Cornwall withdrew from the league. Oxford withdrew the following season when Thurrock T-Birds joined the league.

On 27 April 2023, the RFL confirmed a selection of teams to play in the North and Midlands region along with a soft launch of these two regions in the summer of 2023. The Women's Super League Midlands had four teams: Cheltenham Phoenix, Coventry Bears, Leamington Royals, and Telford Raiders. A Coventry team had previously taken part in Women's Rugby League Conference and the early years of the Challenge Cup, whereas Leamington were launched in 2022 and Telford and Cheltenham were new teams. The competition used a double round-robin format of each team playing home and away and the top two competing in the grand final. On 19 August, Telford, who finished in top place, defeated Coventry 34-18 in the final at Leamington RFC. The 'soft launch' of the Super League North was a series of matches between Newcastle Thunder and Workington Town with the aim that a Scottish team would be added to the competition in 2024. Workington had announced plans to launch a team in 2022 and the Newcastle team had formed in 2023. The first match took place on 9 July 2023, after both teams had taken part in the RFL Women's Nines earlier in the year.

=== 2024 structure ===
The RFL's January 2024 statement about the league stated there would be three regional competitions named Midlands, Northern and Southern Championships rather than the four previously proposed. Due to only having two teams, Newcastle Thunder and Workington Town, the "North" group did not go ahead and Workington joined League 2. The "Roses" group was renamed Northern Championship for the inaugural season. Due to limited numbers in the Midlands Championship, the Midlands group played a festival format for 2024 thus were ineligible for the national playoffs and promotion.

Clubs competing in the 2024 season
Northern	Midlands	Southern
Bottom four 2023 Super League clubs: Bradford Bulls; Castleford Tigers; Salford Red Devils; Leigh Leopards; Top five 2023 Championship clubs: Hull Kingston Rovers; Dewsbury Moor; Stanningley; Oulton Raidettes; Sheffield Eagles	Coventry Bears; Leamington Royals; Nottingham Outlaws; Telford Raiders	Participating 2023 Super League South clubs: Army; Bedford Tigers; Cardiff Demons; London Broncos

=== 2025–present ===
In December 2024, the RFL announced that the Northern Championship would be expanded with Cardiff Demons and London Broncos transferring from the Southern Championship. Hull FC and Swinton Lionesses moving up from League One in the place of Stanningley created in a 12-team competition. However, the withdrawal of Dewsbury Moor meant that only 11 teams started the 2025 season. The Southern Championship expanded to six teams with Anglian Vipers, Brentwood Eels, Bristol Golden Ferns and North Herts Crusaders joining the competition. Bedford Tigers were unable to fulfil any of their fixtures and were excluded from the final league table. The Midlands Championship also expanded to six teams with the addition of Midlands Hurricanes and Sheffield Eagles A, but retained the festival format used in 2024.

In November 2025, the RFL launched its National Community Rugby League (NCRL) initiative which proposed a restructuring of the amateur rugby league competitions. The change saw women's competitions which operate within the Women's Rugby League (WRL) form part of the NCRL structure.

Ahead of the 2026 season, the Northern Championship was rebranded as the National Championship, reflecting the inclusion of London and Cardiff; in addition to being the sole second tier competition. Beneath the National Championship sits the third tier Midlands and Southern Championship, as well as Northern Leagues 1-3.

== Clubs ==
Clubs competing in the 2026 season
National	Midlands	Southern
Bradford Bulls; Cardiff Demons; Castleford Tigers; Hull FC; Hull Kingston Rovers; London Broncos; Manchester Swinton Lionesses; Oulton Raidettes; Salford; Sheffield Eagles; Warrington Wolves; Widnes Vikings	Aston Warriors; Coventry Bears; Leamington Royals; Midlands Hurricanes; Nottingham Outlaws; Telford Raiders	Anglian Vipers; Army; Bedford Tigers; Brentwood Eels; Bristol Golden Ferns; North Herts Crusaders

== Results ==
From 2017 to 2023, the RFL Women's Championship only operated in Northern England and thus were national second tier champions. In 2024, teams of this competition would go on to form the Northern Championship, which became the National Championship in 2026.

Season	Champions	Score	Runners-up	League Leaders
2017	Stanningley	28–10	Oulton Raidettes	Stanningley
2018	Stanningley	20–12	Leigh Miners Rangers	Stanningley
2019	Warrington Wolves	40–4	Barrow	Warrington Wolves
2020	Cancelled due to the COVID-19 pandemic			
2021	Leigh Miners Rangers	10–6	Barrow	Leigh Miners Rangers
2022	Oulton Raidettes	33–14	Salford Red Devils	Salford Red Devils
2023	Hull Kingston Rovers	30–16	Oulton Raidettes	Hull Kingston Rovers
2024 (Note: The table shows the league leaders and grand final of the Northern Championship. The champions, Leigh Leopards, went on to defeat the winner of the Southern Championship, London Broncos, 22–18 in the National Championship final.)	Leigh Leopards	46–6	Sheffield Eagles	Leigh Leopards
2025	Featherstone Rovers	20–10	London Broncos	London Broncos
2026	London Broncos	28–10	Manchester Swinton Lionesses	Manchester Swinton Lionesses

=== Champions ===
List of teams by number of Grand Final wins
Club	Wins	Winning years
Stanningley	2	2017, 2018
Leigh Leopards (Note: as Leigh Miners Rangers in 2021)	2	2021, 2024
Warrington Wolves	1	2019
Oulton Raidettes	1	2022
Hull Kingston Rovers	1	2023
Featherstone Rovers	1	2025
London Broncos	1	2026
