= Salford RLFC Women =

English women's rugby league football club

Club information
- Colours: Red, White and Black
- Founded: 2021; 5 years ago

Current details
- Ground: CorpAcq Stadium
- Coach: Mike Grady
- Competition: National Championship
- 2026 season: 12th

Salford RLFC Women are the women's rugby league team of the Salford RLFC in Salford, Greater Manchester, England. The team was established as the Salford Red Devils in 2021 and competed in the RFL Women's Super League in 2023. As of the 2026 season they compete in the Women's National Championship.

== History ==
Salford Red Devils announced the establishment of the women's team in October 2021. On 15 January 2022, the team played their first game; a pre-season friendly against Swinton Lionesses. In the 2022 season, Salford won the League Cup and the League Leaders' Shield in the Championship, but lost in the Grand Final to Oulton Raidettes. However, with Oulton opting to remain in the Championship, Salford were promoted to the 2023 RFL Women's Super League. In 2023, Salford made their debut in the Challenge Cup. They began their Super League campaign with a 20–8 away win at Castleford Tigers in Group 2 of the competition and their round seven win over Bradford Bulls set them up to finish fourth in the table and qualify for the play-offs. A 28–10 semi-final loss to Leigh Leopards saw them demoted to the second tier of the national pyramid due to the restructuring of the league for 2024. In January 2024, it was announced that they would be in the Northern Women's Championship. Salford finished the 2024 season in third place, but then lost to Sheffield Eagles in the play-off semi-finals. In the 2025 season, Salford reached the final of the Challenge Shield in May but lost 12–4 to Swinton Lionesses. The following month they faced each other in a Championship match which was intended to establish an annual Pankhurst Cup fixture between the two teams. (Note: named in honour of Emmeline Pankhurst; a suffragette associated with the local area) Following the demise of Salford Red Devils in December 2025, the women's team were removed from the draw for 2026 Challenge Cup.

== Seasons ==
Season	League									Play-offs	Challenge Cup	Ref.
Season	Division	P	W	D	L	F	A	Pts	Pos	Play-offs	Challenge Cup	Ref.
2022	Championship	15	14	0	1	542	136	28	1st	Lost in Final	Did not participate	
2023	Super League Group 2	10	4	0	6	176	248	8	4th	Lost in Semi-Final	GS	
2024	Northern Championship	16	10	0	6	392	248	20	3rd	Lost in Semi-Final	GS	
2025	Northern Championship	10	7	0	3	234	140	14	4th	Lost in Semi-Final	Did not participate	
2026	National Championship	12	1	0	11	72	624	1	12th	Did not qualify	Did not participate	

== Honours ==
=== Leagues ===
- RFL Women's Championship
  League Leaders' Shield (1): 2022

=== Cups ===
- League Cup / Challenge Shield
  Winners (1): 2022
  Runners-up (1): 2025
