= 2022 RFL Women's Super League South =

- Teams: 6
- Matches played: 18 (15 regular + 3 playoff)
- Champions: Cardiff Demons

The 2022 Rugby Football League Women's Super League South (known as the Betfred Women's Super League South due to sponsorship) was the second season of the Women's Super League South rugby league competition composed of teams from the south of England and Wales.

== Teams ==
Locations of teams in Southern England and Wales

On 29 March 2022, the fixtures for the season were announced with seven teams, including newcomers Oxford Cavaliers, due to take part in the league in which all the teams would play each other once after which the top four advanced to the play-offs. However, only six teams took part after the Cornish Rebels withdrew from the competition.

- Army Rugby League
- Bedford Tigers
- Bristol Golden Ferns
- Cardiff Demons
- London Broncos
- Oxford Cavaliers

== Results ==
Home \ Away	ARM	BED	BRI	CAR	LON	OXF
Army	—	56–18	—	12–72	—	—
Bedford Tigers	—	—	64–18	—	22–40	24–0 (Note: result not given on Match Centre - score based on league table)
Bristol Golden Ferns	22–26	—	—	0–58	24–54	—
Cardiff Demons	—	56–0	—	—	18–20	94–0
London Broncos	22–12	—	—	—	—	104–0
Oxford Cavaliers	6–44	—	16–18	—	—	—

Source: RFL: Match Centre
Legend: Blue = home team win; Yellow = draw; Red = away team win.

== Table ==
Pos	Team	Pld	W	D	L	PF	PA	PD	Pts	Qualification
1	London Broncos	5	5	0	0	240	76	+164	10	Advance to play-off semi-finals
2	Cardiff Demons	5	4	0	1	298	32	+266	8	Advance to play-off semi-finals
3	Army	5	3	0	2	150	140	+10	6	Advance to play-off semi-finals
4	Bedford Tigers	5	2	0	3	128	170	−42	4	Advance to play-off semi-finals
5	Bristol Golden Ferns	5	1	0	4	82	218	−136	2	
6	Oxford Cavaliers	5	0	0	5	22	284	−262	0	

== Finals series ==
Betfred Women's Super League South finals
Home	Score	Away	Match Information
Home	Score	Away	Date and Time	Venue	Referee
Semi-finals
Cardiff Demons	30–16	Army RL
London Broncos	44–6	Bedford Tigers
Grand Final
Cardiff Demons	34–4	London Broncos	27 August 2022	Cardiff Arms Park
