= 2023 RFL Women's Super League South =

Women's rugby league competition

- Teams: 6
- Champions: London Broncos
- Biggest home win: Cardiff Demons 72–8 Bedford Tigers
- Biggest away win: Thurrock T-Birds 4–58 Bedford Tigers

The 2023 Rugby Football League Women's Super League South was the third season of the Women's Super League South rugby league competition composed of teams from the south of England and Wales. On 31 January 2023 the Rugby Football League (RFL) announced a new pyramid for the women's game from 2024 meaning that 2023 would be the final season of the Super League South before becoming integrated into this new structure as a tier 2 competition.

The opening match of the season, Thurrock T-Birds 8–56 Army, was played on 27 May. Defending champions Cardiff Demons won all five of their matches to top the league and defeated Bedford Tigers 72–8 in the semi-final. London Broncos finished second in the league having only lost once; 8–10 to Cardiff. They won their semi-final 22–12 against the Army to set up a rematch of the 2022 Grand Final. On 27 August, London Broncos took the 2023 Women's Super League South title with a 22–10 win over Cardiff Demons. London and Cardiff both earned places in the 2024 Challenge Cup as a result of reaching the Grand Final.

== Teams ==
Locations of teams in Southern England and Wales

On 31 January 2023, the fixtures for the season were announced with seven teams, including newcomers Thurrock T-Birds, due to take part in the league in which all the teams would play each other once after which the top four advanced to the play-offs. However, revised fixture lists included only six teams following the withdrawal of the Oxford Cavaliers before the start of the competition.

- Army Rugby League
- Bedford Tigers
- Bristol Golden Ferns
- Cardiff Demons
- London Broncos
- Thurrock T-Birds

== Fixtures and results ==
Home \ Away	ARM	BED	BRI	CAR	LON	THU
Army	—	—	40–14	—	—	—
Bedford Tigers	14–36	—	—	4–46	—	—
Bristol Golden Ferns	—	8–54	—	—	—	24–0
Cardiff Demons	32–10	—	56–0	—	—	24–0 (Note: Match cancelled, 24–0 win awarded to Cardiff)
London Broncos	40–10	38–22	24–0 (Note: Match cancelled, 24–0 win awarded to London)	8–10	—	—
Thurrock T-Birds	8–56	4–58	—	—	0–24	—

Source: RFL: Match Centre
Legend: Blue = home team win; Yellow = draw; Red = away team win.

== Table ==
Pos	Team	Pld	W	D	L	PF	PA	PD	Pts	Qualification
1	Cardiff Demons	5	5	0	0	168	22	+146	10	Advance to play-off semi-finals
2	London Broncos	5	4	0	1	134	42	+92	8	Advance to play-off semi-finals
3	Army	5	3	0	2	152	108	+44	6	Advance to play-off semi-finals
4	Bedford Tigers	5	2	0	3	152	132	+20	4	Advance to play-off semi-finals
5	Bristol Golden Ferns	5	1	0	4	46	174	−128	2	
6	Thurrock T-Birds	5	0	0	5	12	186	−174	0	

Source: RFL: Match Centre

== Playoffs ==
Betfred Women's Super League South finals
Home	Score	Away	Match Information
Home	Score	Away	Date and Time	Venue	Referee
Semi-finals
Cardiff Demons	72–8	Bedford Tigers	13 August 2023	Cardiff University
London Broncos	22–12	Army RL	13 August 2023	Rosslyn Park
Grand Final
Cardiff Demons	10–22	London Broncos	27 August 2023	Rosslyn Park	Peter Hamer
Source:RFL: Match CentreWRL: Cardiff Demons
