= Bedford Tigers =

English amateur rugby league club

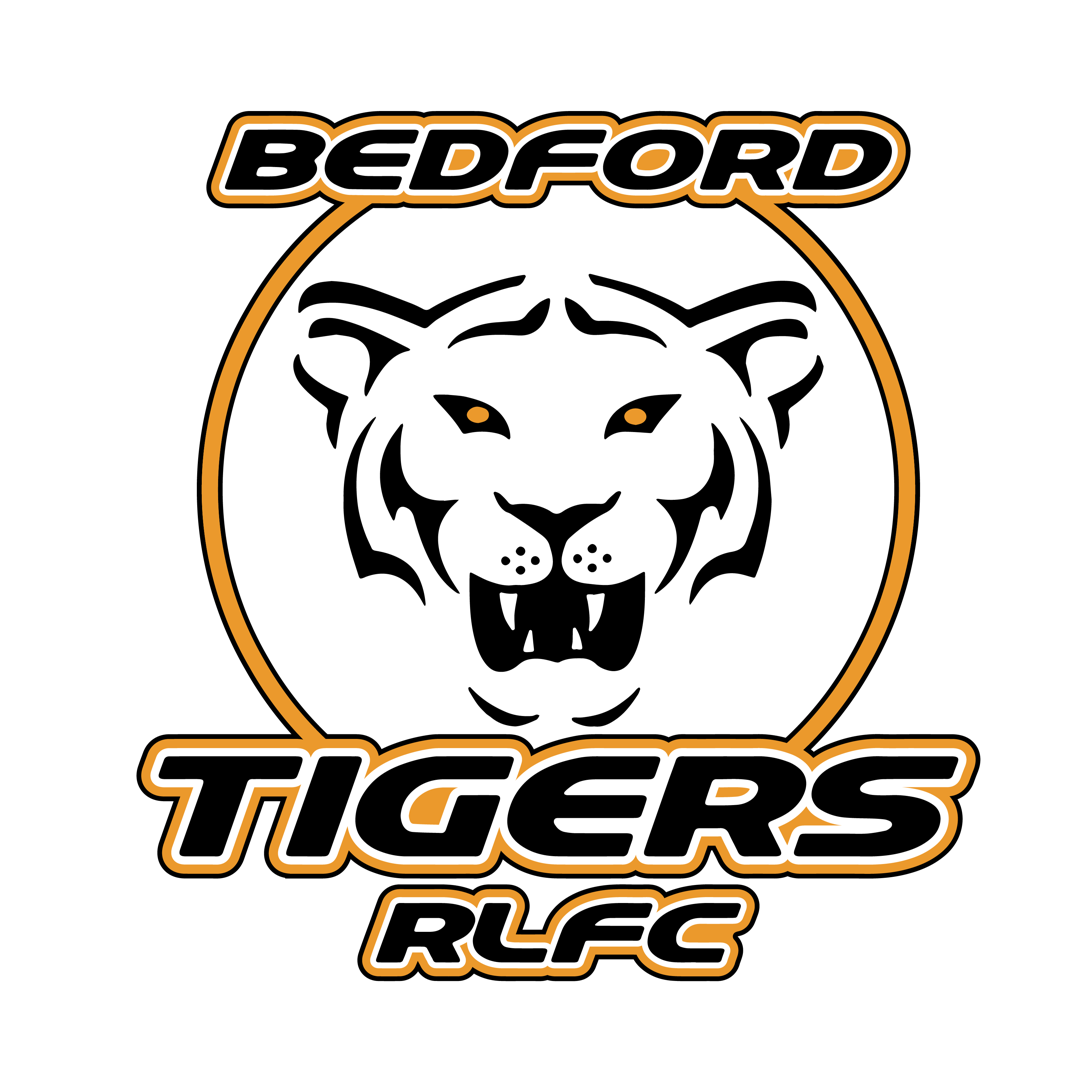

Club information
- Full name: Bedford Tigers RLFC
- Colours: Black, White & Gold
- Founded: 2004; 22 years ago
- Website: www.bedfordtigersrlfc.com

Current details
- Ground: Putnoe Woods, Wentworth Drive, Bedford
- Competition: Men - Southern Conference League; Women - Southern Women's Championship

Bedford Tigers RLFC is a rugby league club based in Bedford, England. The first team plays in the Southern Conference, with a second team in the East Premier League. As a club, Bedford Tigers have moved to their own ground in 2018 and have two senior sides as well as two junior sides, a satellite programme and proposed schools program too.

== History ==
Rugby league was played in Bedford from 1997 until the summer of 2002 under the control of the Bedford Swifts rugby union club who operated a league team in the Rugby League Conference. However, the Swifts decided at the conclusion of the 2002 summer season to cease operations.

In 2004 Bedford Tigers RLFC was founded and competed in the London League. The Tigers only fielded one team but moved up into the Eastern Division of the Rugby League Conference in 2005.

In 2006 the Tigers first team were crowned champions of the Eastern Division after defeating St Ives Roosters in the regional grand final. A feat they replicated the following year too. The Tigers first team moved into the stronger Midlands Premier before trying the Rugby League Conference South Premier in 2009 and finished in fifth place.

In 2015 Tigers became "Triple Crown" Champions and secured the 2015 East RL league as well as East RL 9s and Cup double, a feat that has yet to be matched. This was by far the Tigers most successful season both on and off the field.

In 2016 Tigers Tigers came top of the East RL but lost in the play off final. However, they retained the East RL Cup and 9s trophies for the second year in a row. Tigers went on to become finalists in the league play off final in 2017 and 2018, retaining the East RL Cup again in 2017, and again in 2018 for an unprecedented fourth time in a row. In the five seasons from 2014 to 2018, Bedford Tigers had made the final of every competition they entered.

In 2019 Bedford Tigers gained inclusion into the new Southern Conference League, the fourth tier of Rugby League, where on their debut season finished fourth.

In 2020 Bedford Tigers for the first time in their history, competed in the Challenge Cup away to 2019 Cumberland Cup winners Distington.

In July 2024, the club applied to join League 1 in the 2025 season, but were unsuccessful as the Rugby Football League approved the application submitted by Goole Vikings instead.

== League history ==
- 2004 – Founded and competed in the LARL Merit League
- 2005 – East Conference
- 2006 – East Conference "Champions"
- 2007 – East Conference "Champions"
- 2008 – Midlands Premier – 4th
- 2009 – Southern Premier – 5th
- 2010 – East Conference – Runners up
- 2011 – East Conference – 1st – Lost in Playoff Semi-final
- 2012 – East Conference – 3rd – Lost in Playoff Semi-final
- 2013 – East Premier – 3rd – Lost in Playoff Semi-final
- 2014 – East Premier – 4th – Runners up
- 2015 – East Premier – 1st – "Champions"
- 2016 – East Premier – 1st – Runners up
- 2017 – East Premier – 3rd – Runners up
- 2018 – East Premier – 2nd – Runners up
- 2019 – Southern Conference – 4th – Lost in Playoff Semi-Final

== Community work ==
In 2018 the Tigers set up the Bedfordshire Rugby League Foundation. The aim of the foundation is to tie all of the Tigers' community activity together. They have set up 3 other "Satellite Clubs", Ampthill Hornets, Dunstable Dragons and Luton Vipers with the aim of generating local junior activity and competition in the summer months. These clubs have U14 and U16 age ranges and provide the start of the player pathway to the Tigers senior squad.

Schools – The Tigers will launch school activity in 2018 by providing coaching and competition administration for local schools in the town and nearby areas.

== Honours ==
- East RL Premier Champions – 2006, 2007, 2015,
- East RL Community Challenge Cup Winners – 2015, 2016, 2017, 2018
- East RL 9s Winners – 2015, 2016,
- East Entry League Champions – 2013, 2016 (Development Team)
- East Merit League: 2012 Development Team (minor Premiers)
- RLC National Grand Finalists – 2007 (Widnes Saints crowned Champions in the National Grand Final)
- RLC South of England Champions – 2007 (After defeating the Plymouth Titans in the semi-final of the National Cup)
- RLC Eastern Division: Champions – 2006, 2007
- Sport Bedford Awards (Bedford County Council): Team of the Year – 2006
- East RL Triple Crown Winners-2015

== Records ==
=== Club records 1st XIII ===
- Record victory – 100 – 0 v Leicester Phoenix 2008
- Highest score – 100 – 0, v Leicester Phoenix 2008
- Most tries in a game – 18 tries v Leicester Phoenix 2008

=== Individual records 1st XIII ===
As at season end 2014

- Tries in a season – 18 – Sam Richbell 2014, Ollie Fountain 2015, Sean 'Treacle' Phimister 2018, Euan Parke 2026,
- Tries in a career – 45 – Sam Richbell 2005 – Present
- Tries in a match – 6 tries, Sam Richbell vs King's Lynn Black Knights (2015)
- Tries on debut – 4 tries to Zander Pedan v Leicester Phoenix 2008
- Youngest try scorer (1st team) Bradley Hirons – 16 years 85 days vs SW London Chargers
- Goals in a season – 70 – Rob Ashton, 2015.
- Goals in a career – 215 – Rob Ashton, 2006 – 2013
- Goals in a match – 14 – Chris Potts v Leicester Phoenix 2008
- Most points in a season – 164 – Rob Ashton, 2013
- Most points in a career – 534 – Rob Ashton, 2006 – Present
- Most points in a match – 30 – Rob Ashton v MK Wolves 2013 (2 tries, 11 goals)
- Most appearances – 79 – Sam Richbell 2005 – Present

As of 2010 friendlies do not count towards statistics

=== Individuals records 2nd XIII / Development Side ===
- Tries in a match – 6 – Robert Harris v St Albans Centurions 2nds, 2007
- Goals in a match – 11 from 12 – Rob Ashton v St Albans Centurions 2nds, 2007
- Points in a match – 24 – Robert Harris v St Albans Centurions 2nds, 2007 (6T)

== Women's team ==
Between 2021 and 2023, Bedford Tigers fielded a women's team to play in the RFL Women's Super League South. In 2024, following a restructuring of the league system, this became the Southern Women's Championship.

=== Seasons ===
Season	League									Play-offs
Season	Division	P	W	D	L	F	A	Pts	Pos	Play-offs
2021	Super League South: Eastern Conference	4	0	0	4	74	190	0	3rd	Did not qualify
2022	Super League South	5	2	0	3	128	170	4	4th	Lost in Semi Final
2023	Super League South	5	2	0	3	152	132	4	4th	Lost in Semi Final
2024	Southern Championship	6	0	0	6	36	332	-1 (Note: Deducted 1 point for forfeited fixture)	4th	Did not qualify
2025	Southern Championship	Withdrawn from competition								
2026	Southern Championship	3	1	0	2	112	94	2	3rd	Won 3rd-place play-off
