= Aldershot Military Stadium =

British sports venue

Coordinates: 51°15′53″N 0°45′20″W

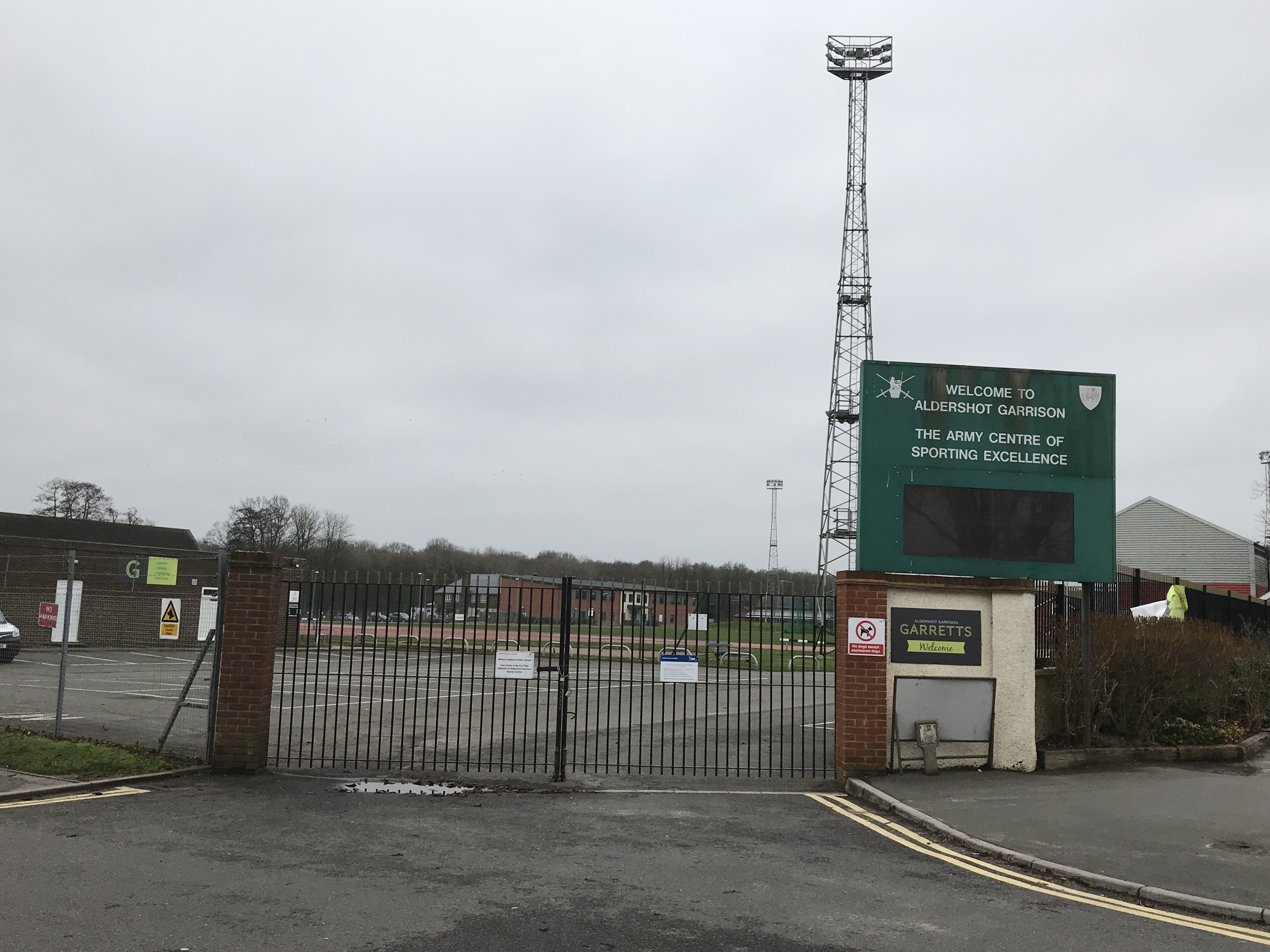
- Interactive map of Aldershot Military Stadium
- Location: Aldershot, Hampshire, GU11 2JL, England
- Owner: British Army
- Capacity: 1,128 seated
- Surface: Grass

Construction
- Opened: 1955

Tenants
- Army FA; Army RU; Army RL; Army AA; Aldershot, Farnham and District Athletics Club

Aldershot Military Stadium is a sports complex in Aldershot, England, comprising a combined football and athletics stadium and a smaller adjoined rugby stadium. It is the home ground of the British Army's football and rugby teams, Aldershot, Farnham and District Athletic Club and the Army Athletics Association.

== Location ==
The stadia are located to the north of Aldershot just off the A325, the main road to Farnborough. It is sited in the Military Town, adjoining all the military buildings including married quarters and barracks.

== Stadia ==
=== The Military Stadium ===
The Military Stadium has a main stand with a seated capacity of 1,128. Also sited are the changing facilities, VIP lounge and control room.

It comprises a fully floodlit eight-lane synthetic athletics track with full field event facilities. During the football season the infield is converted to a football pitch with the throwing disciplines moved outside of the stadium.

=== Rugby Stadium ===
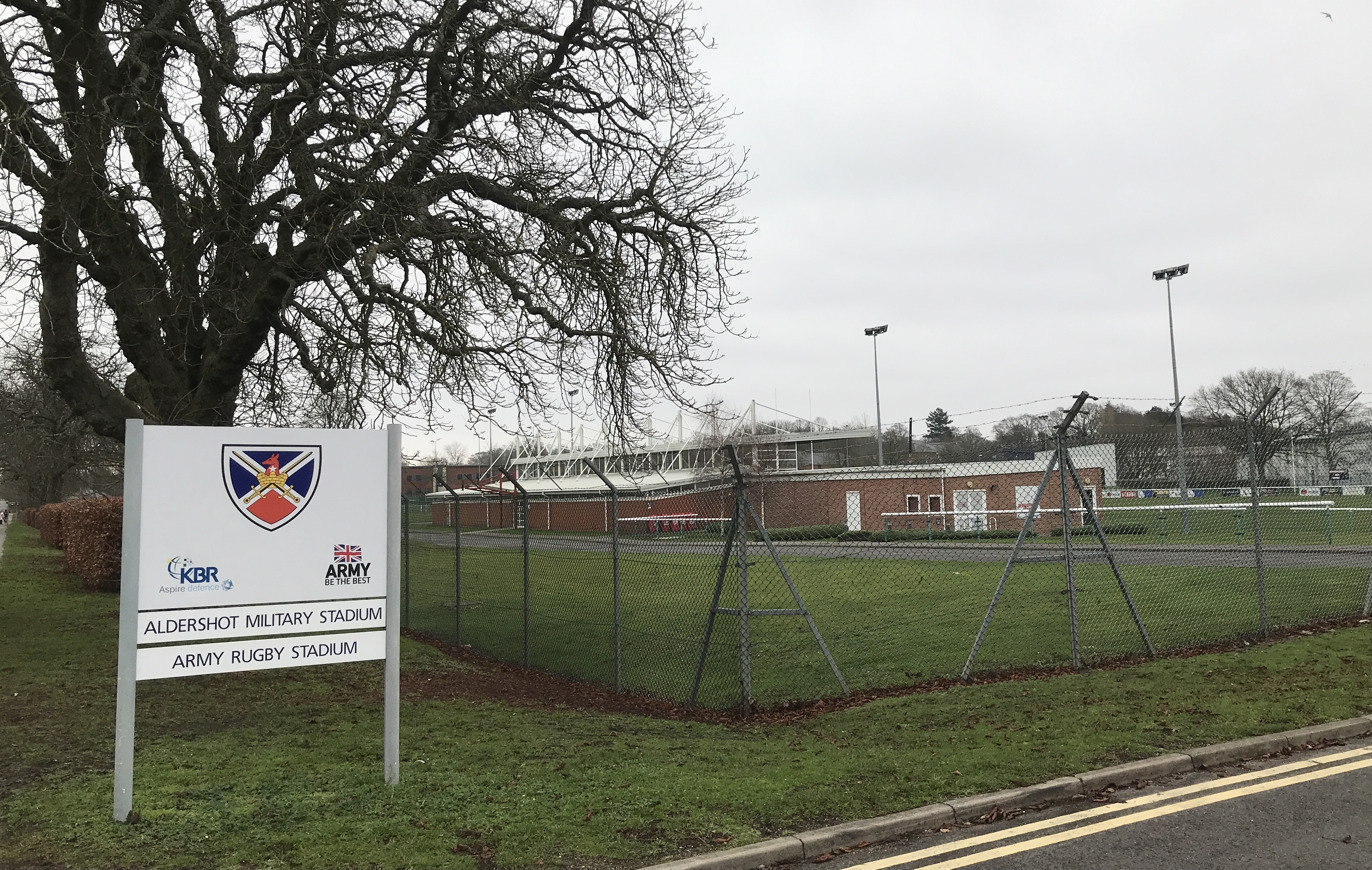
The Rugby Stadium in 2021

The Rugby Stadium has a smaller 500-seat spectator stand with full changing facilities and is fully floodlit. During the 2022 Challenge Cup, the ground hosted the first Army-Navy interservice derby in the competition, which saw the Navy win in golden point extra time.

== History ==
The Military Stadium has been the home of Army run football since 1912.

== Events ==
Every year the stadium plays host to the Army FA Cup Final.

== See also ==
- Army Football Association
- Army Rugby Union
- Army Rugby League
