= British Army Rugby League =

Rugby league team representing the British Army

British Army

Club information
- Full name: British Army Rugby League
- Nickname: Army
- Colours: Red and white
- Founded: 1994

Current details
- Ground: Aldershot Military Stadium
- Competition: Challenge Cup

The British Army Rugby League team is the official rugby league team representing the British Army. The team was founded in 1994 when the Army first recognised rugby league as an official sport and lifted a ban on it. The new team was able to play in the Challenge Cup. The team play their home matches at Aldershot Military Stadium in Aldershot, Hampshire. An Army women's team was set up in 2008.

== History ==
Historically, rugby league had been banned in the British Armed Forces due to the strength of rugby union and the Rugby Football Union's demands that anyone playing rugby league would be banned from playing rugby union. During the Second World War, the Northern Command Sports Board (NCSB) held sympathy towards Northern soldiers who wished to play rugby league. They set up a number of matches between unofficial army representative teams and Northern clubs. This arrangement only lasted until the end of the war when the Army ended a relaxation on the ban and because the NCSB did not wish to try to challenge the primacy of the Army Rugby Union.

The ban was lifted in 1994 following an announcement by the Armed Forces Minister Jeremy Hanley. The new team was founded by Martin Coyd of the Royal Engineers. Due to the wide array of British Army deployments worldwide, the British Army do not play in a league in the English rugby league system. Occasionally they have players from the Army Rugby Union cross codes to play in their matches.

As a result of the ban being lifted, the men's team became eligible to enter the Challenge Cup. Initially in 1999, the Rugby Football League (RFL) were only going to allow the winners of the Inter-Services competition (which the Army won) to enter in the 2000 Challenge Cup but they were eventually persuaded that all three of the services teams were able to enter. The team's best result was to reach the fourth round of the 2020 Challenge Cup, the highest for a forces team since 2010 when the Royal Navy reached the third round. However, none of the military teams took part in the 2021 Challenge Cup because the RFL decided that only professional Rugby League teams would be allowed to compete because of the COVID-19 pandemic. In January 2022, the British Army were drawn against the Royal Navy in the Challenge Cup for the first time in the competition since their inaugural appearances.

== Women's team ==
The Army women's team was established in 2008. In 2014, they were named the Army Sports Team of the Year award at the Army Sports Awards. They first entered the Women's Challenge Cup in 2014 where they lost 30–16 in the quarter-finals (second round) to Thatto Heath. They reached the semi-final of the competition in 2016. In 2017, they were finalists in the Challenge Shield, losing 26–24 to York City Knights. In 2019, they faced York again in the final, but overcame them 40–4 to win the Challenge Shield. In 2021, the women's team were members of the inaugural Super League South and reached the Grand Final. When the national pyramid was restructured ahead of the 2024 season, the Super League South became the Southern Women's Championship. In the 2025 season, the Army won the competition by defeating Bristol Golden Ferns 28–24 in the final. In 2026, they finished as runners-up after losing to Bristol in the final.

== Wheelchair team ==
The wheelchair rugby league team was established in 2019 and compete in inter-services competitions against the RAF and the Navy. In October 2022, the team played Australia in a warm-up game for the 2021 World Cup. In January 2024, the team played against the Wales national team as part of the preparations for Wales' US tour.

== Results ==
=== Challenge Cup ===
Year	2000	2001	2002	2003	2004	2005	2006	2007	2008	2009
Round	R3	R1	R2	R1	—N/a	R2	R2	R3	R3	R2
Year	2010	2011	2012	2013	2014	2015	2016	2017	2018	2019
Round	R3	—N/a	R2	R3	R2	R1	R1	R1	R3	R1
Year	2020	2021	2022	2023	2024	2025				
Round	R4	—N/a	R2	R1	R1	R2				

=== Women's Challenge Cup ===
Year	2014	2015	2016	2017	2018	2019	2020	2021	2022	2023	2024
Round	R2	?	SF	R1	QF	R2	—N/a	—N/a	GS	—N/a	—N/a

=== Women's league seasons ===
Season	League									Play-offs
Season	Division	P	W	D	L	F	A	Pts	Pos	Play-offs
2021	Super League South: Eastern Conference	4	3	0	1	168	66	6	1st	Lost in Grand Final
2022	Super League South	5	3	0	2	150	140	6	3rd	Lost in semi-final
2023	Super League South	5	3	0	2	152	108	6	3rd	Lost in semi-final
2024	Southern Championship	6	2	0	4	150	202	4	3rd	Forfeited semi-final
2025	Southern Championship	4	4	0	0	208	30	8	1st	Won in Final
2026	Southern Championship	3	3	0	0	154	56	6	1st	Lost in Final
