= Thurrock T-Birds =

- Full name: Thurrock Rugby Football Club Ladies
- Union: (England) RFU and RFL
- Nickname(s): T-Birds

Thurrock T-Birds, also called Thurrock Rugby Football Club Ladies, is a women's rugby club in Grays, Essex, England. The club began as a union side in 1988, and in 2023 they also operated a league side that played in the RFL Women's Super League South. The union side plays in Championship 1 South after being relegated from the Women's Premiership in 2013.

== History ==
In 2009, Thurrock T-Birds made it to the promotion playoffs in Championship 2 South East but lost in the final. In 2011, they defeated Oakmeadians Ladies in the playoff to be promoted to Championship 1 South. The following season, Thurrock T-Birds were promoted into the Women's Premiership after defeating Championship 1 North champions, Camp Hill in the promotion playoff. In doing so, they became the first Essex based team to play at the top level of English rugby union. In 2013, they finished bottom of the Women's Premiership which meant they took part in the promotion-relegation playoff against Aylesford Bulls Ladies. They lost and were relegated to Championship 1 South for two years due to there being no promotion or relegation in the next season because of the next season preceding the 2014 Women's Rugby World Cup. In 2014, they appealed against this rule to the Rugby Football Union for Women, claiming that Women's Premiership clubs Saracens Women and Richmond Women were attempting to block Thurrock from being promoted if they won Championship 1.

In 2012, Thurrock T-Birds set a world record for the largest scrum with 584 participants.

In 2023, the club formed a rugby league side that competed in the RFL Women's Super League South.

== Notable players ==
Thurrock T-Birds have provided players for the England women's national rugby union team. Mercedes Foy, Emily Scott and Georgia Cook all played for England women and Thurrock.

== See also ==
- Thurrock Rugby Football Club – men's side
