= RFL Women's Super League South =

Rugby competition

Women's Super League South
- Sport: Rugby league
- Founded: 2021; 5 years ago
- Folded: 2023; 3 years ago
- Replaced by: Women's Southern Championship
- No. of teams: 6
- Country: England; Wales
- Domestic cup: RFL Women's Challenge Cup
- Website: Women's Super League

The Rugby Football League Women's Super League South (known as the Betfred Women's Super League South due to sponsorship) was introduced as a top tier women's rugby league club competitions in Great Britain for teams Southern England and South Wales that ran parallel to the RFL Women's Super League.

Originally intended to start in 2020, but was delayed due to the COVID-19 pandemic. The inaugural season started in mid-June 2021 and ended on 29 August.

In January 2024, it was announced that the Super League South would become the Women's Southern Championship; one of the three regional competitions in the restructured second tier of women's rugby in Great Britain.

== History ==
On 30 April 2021, the Rugby Football League (RFL) announced the establishment of a new "Super League South" competition, which runs in parallel to the existing Women's Super League competition in the north of England, rather than directly expand it and is the top level of club competition in southern England and South Wales. The inaugural Super League south season started in June 2021, competed for by six teams, divided into two conferences of three teams each.

On 31 January 2023, the RFL announced a new pyramid for the women's game, and in doing so confirmed that the 2023 season would be the Super League South's last as a top tier competition. It would become a second tier competition with opportunity for promotion to the RFL Women's Super League and it was intended that this would run parallel with North, Roses, and Midlands leagues. On 24 January, it was revealed that the Super League South would become the Southern Women's Championship and that in 2024 the second tier would have only three leagues: Midlands, Northern and Southern, from which only the winners of the Northern and Southern competitions would play-off for a chance to earn promotion.

== Clubs ==
Clubs in the Super League South with participation by season
Super League South clubs
Club	Location	Seasons	Ref
Army RL	Aldershot, Hampshire	2021–2023	
Bedford Tigers	Bedford, Bedfordshire	2021–2023	
Bristol Golden Ferns	Bristol, Gloucestershire	2021–2023	
Cardiff Demons	Cardiff, Glamorgan	2021–2023	
Cornish Rebels	Redruth, Cornwall	2021	
London Broncos	Wimbledon, Greater London	2021–2023	
Oxford Cavaliers	Brackley, Northamptonshire	2022	
Thurrock T-Birds	Grays, Essex	2023	

== Structure ==
For the inaugural season in 2021, the three teams in each conference played each other twice home and away, for a total of six games each. At the conclusion of these matches, the semi-finals saw the winner of each conference playing the runner-up of the other. The winners of those two games thus played in the Grand Final, with the Cardiff Demons winning 30–26 over the British Army Rugby League side. From 2022, the format changed so that all teams competed in one league with the top four teams qualifying for the play-offs.

The Army were granted a place in the 2022 Women's Challenge Cup as a result of having reached the Grand Final in 2021. In 2023, both Super League South finalists from 2022 took part in the Challenge Cup. London and Cardiff both earned places in the 2024 Challenge Cup as a result of reaching the 2023 Grand Final.

== Champions ==
List of grand final winners, runners-up and league leaders by season
Season	Champions	Score	Runners-up	League Leaders
2021	Cardiff Demons	30–26	Army RL	—N/a
2022	Cardiff Demons	34–4	London Broncos	London Broncos
2023	London Broncos	22–10	Cardiff Demons	Cardiff Demons

== Sponsorship ==
Bookmakers Betfred were announced in 2021 as being the inaugural sponsors of this new competition, as well as continuing their sponsorship of Women's Super League beyond 2021.

== See also ==
- NRL Women's Premiership
