= Bradford Bulls Women =

English rugby league team

Club information
- Full name: Bradford Bulls Women
- Nickname: Bulls
- Founded: 1999 (as Dudley Hill Thunderbirds)

Current details
- Ground: Odsal Stadium (22,000)
- Coach: Noah Gascoigne
- Competition: National Championship
- 2026 Season: 11th

Records
- Women's Super League: 1 (2017)
- Challenge Cups: 1 (2017)

The Bradford Bulls Women are an English professional women's rugby league team based in Bradford, West Yorkshire. Formed in 1999 as an autonomous club, Dudley Hill Thunderbirds, the team was also known as Bradford Thunderbirds and Bradford Clayton Thunderbirds. As the Thunderbirds the club played in the Women's Rugby League Conference and later the Women's Rugby League. As of 2025 they compete in the RFL Women's Championship.

== History ==
=== 1999–2011: Origins ===
The club were founded in 1999 as Dudley Hill Thunderbirds to partner the men's Dudley Hill team. Later on the Thunderbirds and Dudley Hill split and became Bradford Clayton Thunderbirds to reflect playing in the Clayton area of Bradford and later just becoming Bradford Thunderbirds. Since there was no official league for many years they played sporadic fixtures until leagues started being formed such as the Women's Rugby League Conference in 2008 which gave the Thunderbirds and women's rugby league more competitive games. They also won regional leagues of the competition.

=== 2012–2013: Challenge Cup ===
The RFL Women's Challenge Cup was founded in 2012 to give the Women's Conference a competitive cup competition. Bradford had some early success in the cup appearing in the first two editions, losing both to Featherstone Rovers and Thatto Heath Crusaders respectively.

=== 2014–2016: Women's Rugby League ===
In 2012 the club entered the newly formed RFL Women's Rugby League alongside mostly men's community clubs that ran a women's team. In 2014, the club lost a third consecutive Challenge Cup Final to Thatto Heath 32–24. They also reached the Premiership Play-Off final.

After the early success and more popularity in Bradford women's rugby league, the club dropped the Thunderbirds moniker and linked up with the Bradford Bulls in 2016 adopting the Bulls' colours, name and playing at Odsal Stadium. (Note: Before this time club colours had included blue and amber as Dudley Hill Thunderbirds and claret, amber, black and red as Bradford Clayton Thunderbirds) In their first season as the Bulls they reached a second Grand Final in three years, although they lost 36-8 to treble winners Thatto Heath.

=== 2017–present: Super League ===
After the 2016 season the Women's Rugby League was disbanded and new competition was set up. The RFL Women's Super League was set up in 2017 to give the sport a bigger profile and more professionalism. The first edition featured only four clubs with Bradford finishing first at the end of the season and going onto win the Grand Final 36–6 against Featherstone. This win completed a league and cup double for the team as earlier in the season they had won the Women's Challenge Cup beating Featherstone 50–16. On 22 December 2023, the Bradford Bulls Foundation announced that Connor Matheson had been appointed as Head Coach. In January 2024, following the restructuring of the women's league pyramid, it was announced that Bradford would be in the Northern Women's Championship.

== Players ==
=== 2026 squad ===
2026 Bradford Bulls Women squad
First team squad			Coaching staff
1 Aimee Martin; 2 Gracie Dutton; 3 Paigan Taylor (VC); 4 Amber Thirkill; 5 Vicki Gleadall (VC); 6 Olivia Chambers; 7 Phoebe Allott; 8 Sarah Garland (C); 9 Grace Waites; 10 Bailey Alexander (VC); 11 Tamzin Butterfield; 12 Georgie Connolly; 13 Cody-Lou Marsh	14 Kiarah Jarvis; 15 Courtney Marsh; 16 Millie Dearn; 17 Lucy Butterfield; 18 Freya-Louise Burn; 19 Chloe Carter; 20 Hollie Pace; 21 Amelia Bairstow; 22 Emily Wright; 23 Ella Cairns; 24 Martha Robinson; 25 Amee Barham; 26 Georgina Dunwell	27 Evelyn Askin; 28 Mia Barrett; 29 Daisy Johnson; 30 Monina Crosby; 31 Jessica Sherriff; 32 El-Roina Sowah	Head coach: Noah Gascoigne; Legend: (c) Captain(s); (vc) Vice-captain(s); Updated: 24 February 2026; Source(s):

== Seasons ==
Season	League									Play-offs	Challenge Cup
Season	Division	P	W	D	L	F	A	Pts	Pos	Play-offs	Challenge Cup
2012	Premier	14	Unknown					18	3rd	Lost in Grand Final	RU
2013	Premier	11	9	0	2	380	195	18	2nd	Lost in Grand Final	RU
2014	Premier	Unknown								Lost in Grand Final	RU
2015	Premier	14	11	0	3	560	221	22	3rd	Lost in Round 2	?
2016	Premier	Unknown								Lost in Grand Final	SF
2017	Super League	6	6	0	0	300	76	12	1st	Won in Grand Final	W
2018	Super League	12	5	0	7	292	312	10	5th	Did not qualify	R2
2019	Super League	13	4	1	8	300	282	9	6th	Did not qualify	QF
2020	Super League	Cancelled due to the COVID-19 pandemic									
2021	Super League	8	2	0	6	128	294	4	9th	Did not qualify	QF
2022	Super League (G2)	12	6	0	6	202	296	12	4th	Did not qualify	GS
2023	Super League (G2)	10	2	1	7	124	350	5	5th	Lost in Semi Final	GS
2024	Northern Championship	16	3	0	13	182	518	6	7th	Did not qualify	GS
2025	Northern Championship	10	1	0	9	50	336	2	10th	Did not qualify	—N/a
2026	National Championship	12	1	0	11	68	490	1	11th	Did not qualify	—N/a

== Honours ==
=== Leagues ===
- Super League / RFL Women's Rugby League

Winners (1): 2017
Runners up (2): 2014, 2016

=== Cups ===
- Challenge Cup

Winners (1): 2017
Runners up (3): 2012, 2013, 2014
