= Bristol All Golds =

English rugby league team, based in Bristol

Club information
- Full name: Bristol All Golds
- Short name: All Golds
- Founded: 2019
- Website: https://www.allgoldsrugby.co.uk/

Current details
- Ground: Lockleaze Sports Centre
- Coach: Marcus Brown

Bristol All Golds is a rugby league team based at Lockleaze Sports Centre

Bristol All Golds, formerly the University of Gloucestershire All Golds, consist of six different teams, with the first team entering Kingstone Press Championship 1 for the 2013 season and exiting it to join the Southern Conference League in 2017. Below the semi-professional side, there are two student teams that compete in the British Universities and Colleges Sport (BUCS) leagues; the All Golds in the Super 8 national league and the All Blues in the Wales and West Division.

There are also three junior sides that take part in the Midlands Junior League.

== Men's team ==
=== History ===
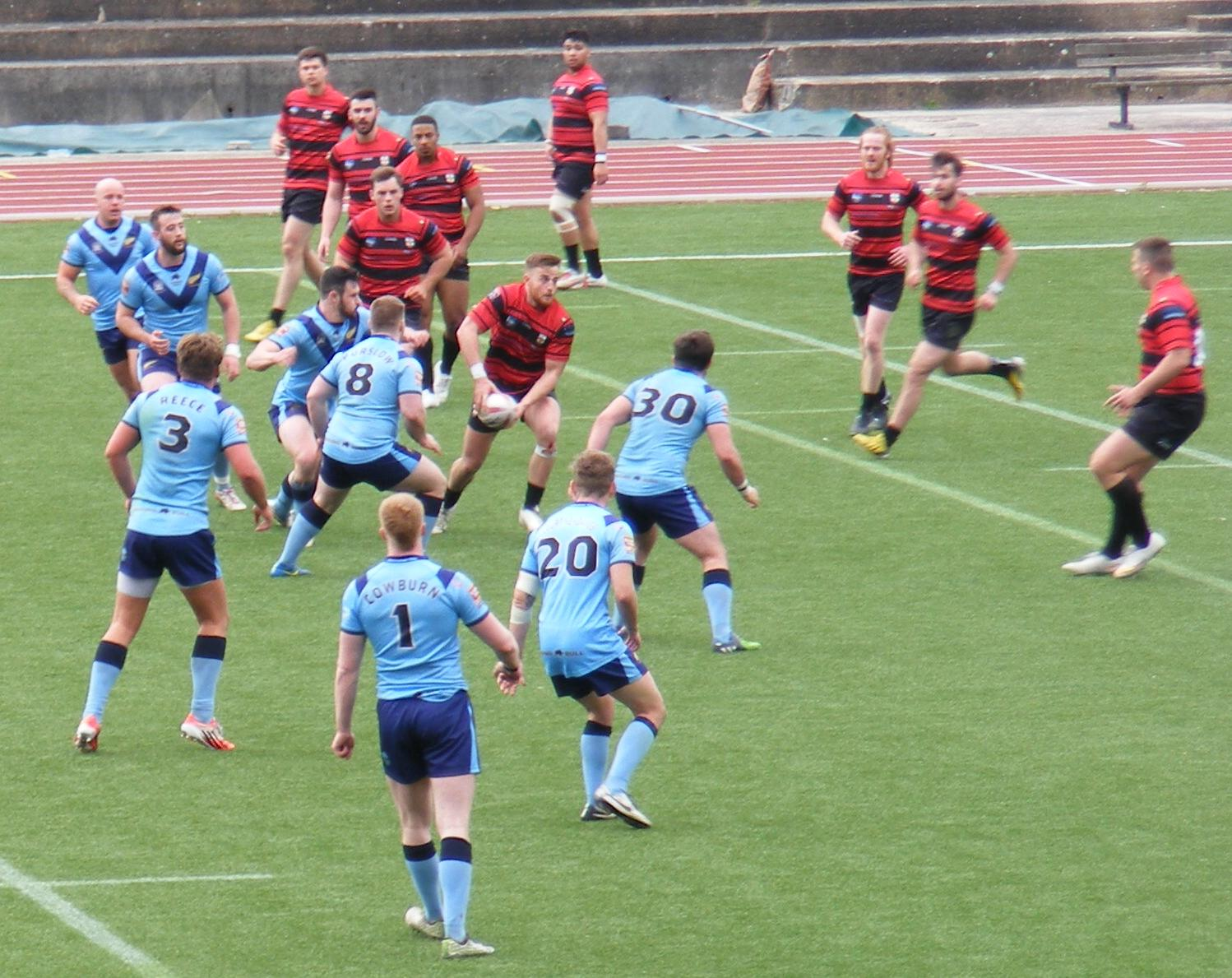
All Golds (blue) play London Skolars (red) in the 2015 Championship 1

The University of Gloucestershire rugby league club dates back to the late 1990s. In 2008, they were given a slot in the BUCS Super 8, the highest student rugby league division, which they retained until 2017. In 2012, the All Golds' senior team defeated Super League clubs London Broncos, Widnes and Salford in a Rugby League 9s competition. The student squad also reached the semi-finals of the Super 8. The All Golds launched a junior academy in April consisting of three sides competing in the Midlands Junior League.

In March 2013, the University of Gloucestershire All Golds entered the semi-professional ranks for the first time featuring in the Kingstone Press Championship 1 league alongside fellow newcomers Hemel Stags and Oxford. Brad Hepi was appointed head coach of the Gloucestershire All-Golds for the 2013 season. He coached the side in their first season of the Kingstone Press Championship 1 league where they reached bottom place. In the 2014 Kingston Press Championship 1 season he saw the side into the first seven-game before stepping down from the position, stating he had taken the side as far as he could. The club's community manager Dan Garbutt took charge of All Golds for one game against Hemel Stags before Steve McCormack was appointed for the remainder of the 2014 season.

On 3 November 2014, former Halifax assistant coach Lee Greenwood was appointed the head coach after Steve McCormack had left for 'personal reasons' at the end of the 2014 season.

At the end of the 2017 season, it was announced that the All Golds would merge with Oxford to form a club in Bristol for 2019. However, when this failed to occur, the club continued to operate in the Southern Rugby league.

=== Seasons summary ===
Season	League									Play-offs	Challenge Cup
Season	Division	P	W	D	L	F	A	Pts	Pos	Play-offs	Challenge Cup
1990s–2012	Transfer to semi-professional club from BUCS										
2013	Championship 1	16	2	1	13	286	629	12	9th	Did not qualify	R3
2014	Championship 1	20	8	0	12	446	616	29	6th	Did not qualify	R3
2015	Championship 1	22	8	0	14	562	677	16	9th	Did not qualify	R4
2016	League 1	14	3	0	11	334	479	6	12th	Fourth in Shield	R4
2017	League 1	15	6	0	9	310	530	12	12th	Fourth in Shield	R4
2018	Conference League South - Western Conference	No Competition								N/A	Did not participate
2019	Conference League South - Western Conference	12	7	5	0	327	312	14	3rd	Did not qualify	Did not participate
2019	Conference League South - Western Conference	No Competition due to the COVID-19 pandemic								N/A	Did not participate
2021	Conference League South - Western Conference	6	2	3	1	114	186	3	3rd	Did not qualify	Did not participate
2022	Conference League South - Western Conference	5	4	1	0	138	54	8	1st	Lost in preliminary round	Did not participate
2023	Conference League South	14	6	8	0	280	424	12	5th	Did not qualify	Did not participate
2024	Conference League South	12	6	4	2	322	278	14	4th	Lost in semi-final	Did not participate
2025	Conference League South	14	6	0	8	310	486	12	5th	Did not qualify	Did not participate

== Women's team ==
After a number of years of dormancy, the Golden Ferns name was resurrected in 2021 for a new women's rugby league team which competed in the RFL Women's Super League South competition between 2021 and 2023. In 2024, a restructuring of the league pyramid saw the Golden Ferns move to Southern West League 1 competition and then up to the Southern Championship in 2025. In the 2025 season, the Golden Ferns finished second in the league and lost 28–24 to the Army in the final. The reached the final again in 2026, this time defeating the Army 54–6 to win their first title.

=== Seasons ===
Season	League									Play-offs
Season	Division	P	W	D	L	F	A	Pts	Pos	Play-offs
2021	Super League South: Western Conference	4	1	1	2	56	222	3	2nd	Lost in semi-final
2022	Super League South	5	1	0	4	82	218	2	5th	Did not qualify
2023	Super League South	5	1	0	4	46	174	2	5th	Did not qualify
2024	Southern West League 1	Unknown								
2025	Southern Championship	4	3	0	1	188	98	6	2nd	Lost in Final
2026	Southern Championship	3	2	0	1	132	70	4	2nd	Won in Final

== See also ==
- Rugby Football League expansion
