= 2015 Wigan Warriors season =

- Super League XX Rank: 2nd
- Play-off result: Runners-up
- Challenge Cup: 6th Round
- 2015 record: Wins: 21; draws: 1; losses: 11
- Points scored: For: 874; against: 590

Team information
- Chairman: Ian Lenagan
- Head Coach: Shaun Wane
- Captain: Sean O'Loughlin
- Stadium: DW Stadium

Top scorers
- Tries: Joe Burgess - 26
- Goals: Matty Smith - 78
- Points: Matty Smith - 176
← 2014	List of seasons	2016 →

This article details the Wigan Warriors rugby league football club's 2015 season. This was the Warriors' 20th season in the Super League.

== Preseason friendlies ==
LEGEND
Win
Draw
Loss

Wigan score is first.

Date	Competition	Vrs	H/A	Venue	Result	Score	Tries	Goals	Att
18/1/15	Pre Season	Leigh	A	Leigh Sports Village	L	14-18	Charnley, Hampshire, Burgess	Smith 0/2, Hampshire 1/1	4,125
25/1/15	Pre Season	St. Helens	A	Langtree Park	L	12-28	Bateman, C.Farrell	Smith 2/2	6,888

== World Club Series ==
LEGEND
Win
Draw
Loss

Date	Competition	Vrs	H/A	Venue	Result	Score	Tries	Goals	Att
21 February 2015	WCC	Brisbane	H	DW Stadium	L	12-14	L.Farrell, Burgess	Smith 2/2	20,842

2015 World Club Series Teams
Wigan Warriors	positions	Brisbane Broncos
1. Matthew Bowen	Fullback	1. Jordan Kahu
2. Josh Charnley	Winger	2. Daniel Vidot
3. Anthony Gelling	Centre	3. Aaron Whitchurch
4. Dan Sarginson	Centre	4. Justin Hodges
5. Joe Burgess	Winger	5. Lachlan Maranta
6. George Williams	Stand off	6. Anthony Milford
7. Matty Smith	Scrum half	7. Ben Hunt
8. Dom Crosby	Prop	8. Josh McGuire
9. Michael McIlorum	Hooker	9. Andrew McCullough
28. Ryan Sutton	Prop	10. Adam Blair
11. Joel Tomkins	2nd Row	11. Alex Glenn
12. Liam Farrell	2nd Row	12. Sam Thaiday
14. John Bateman	Loose forward	13. Corey Parker
17. Tony Clubb	Interchange	14. Mitchell Dodds
24. Taulima Tautai	Interchange	15. James Gavet
25. Larne Patrick	Interchange	16. Joe Ofahengaue
26. Logan Tomkins	Interchange	17. Kodi Nikorima
Shaun Wane	Coach	Wayne Bennett

== Super League ==
LEGEND
Win
Draw
Loss

=== Regular season ===
==== Matches ====
Date	Competition	Rnd	Vrs	H/A	Venue	Result	Score	Tries	Goals	Att	Live on TV
5/2/15	Super League XX	1	Widnes	A	Halton Stadium	D	22-22	J.Tomkins, Gelling (2), Burgess	Smith 3/4	9,286	Sky Sports
13/2/15	Super League XX	2	Huddersfield	H	DW Stadium	W	24-16	J.Tomkins (2), Bateman, McIlorum, Sutton	Powell 0/1, Hampshire 2/4	12,448	Sky Sports
1/3/15	Super League XX	3	Hull Kingston Rovers	A	Craven Park	L	20-22	Burgess, Mossop, Charnley, Williams	Smith 2/4	7,632	-
6/3/15	Super League XX	4	Castleford	A	The Jungle	L	14-42	Charnley (2), Smith	Smith 1/3	7,772	-
13/3/15	Super League XX	5	Hull FC	H	DW Stadium	W	13-12	J.Tomkins, Sarginson	Smith 2/2, Smith 1 DG	11,718	-
20/3/15	Super League XX	6	Leeds	A	Headingley Stadium	L	14-26	Smith, Burgess	Smith 3/3	18,350	Sky Sports
27/3/15	Super League XX	7	Wakefield Trinity	H	DW Stadium	W	52-10	L.Farrell (2), Smith, Manfredi (2), Gelling (3), Mossop	Smith 7/8, Clubb 1/1	10,787	-
3/4/15	Super League XX	8	St. Helens	H	DW Stadium	W	12-4	Manfredi, Burgess	Smith 1/1, Hampshire 1/1	24,054	Sky Sports
6/4/15	Super League XX	9	Salford	A	AJ Bell Stadium	L	18-24	Patrick, Hampshire, Burgess	Hampshire 3/3	6,561	-
12/4/15	Super League XX	10	Catalans Dragons	H	DW Stadium	W	34-0	Burgess (2), Sarginson, Manfredi (3), Gelling, Hampshire	Hampshire 1/8	12,162	-
16/4/15	Super League XX	11	Warrington	H	DW Stadium	W	30-20	L.Farrell, Hampshire, Manfredi (3), Gelling	Smith 3/6	14,175	Sky Sports
23/4/15	Super League XX	12	Wakefield Trinity	A	Belle Vue	W	40-22	Crosby, Smith, Burgess (3), Manfredi, Mossop	Smith 6/7	3,107	Sky Sports
1/5/15	Super League XX	13	Hull Kingston Rovers	H	DW Stadium	W	60-0	Crosby, Burgess (3), L.Farrell, J.Tomkins, Williams (2), Sarginson, Manfredi, Tautai	Smith 8/11	11,468	Sky Sports
8/5/15	Super League XX	14	Castleford	H	DW Stadium	W	28-0	Burgess, McIlorum, Sarginson, Manfredi	Smith 6/6	15,022	-
23/5/15	Super League XX	15	Catalans Dragons	A	Stade Gilbert Brutus	L	16-58	Charnley, Sarginson, Burgess	Smith 2/3	10,423	Sky Sports
30/5/15	Magic Weekend	16	Leeds	N	St James' Park	W	27-12	Sarginson, Williams, Burgess, Bowen (2)	Smith 2/4, Crosby 1/1, Smith 1 DG	40,871	Sky Sports
7/6/15	Super League XX	17	Huddersfield	A	Galpharm Stadium	W	32-18	Burgess, L.Farrell (2), Charnley (2), Bateman	Smith 4/6	7,307	-
12/6/15	Super League XX	18	St. Helens	A	Langtree Park	L	14-30	Sarginson, Burgess, J.Tomkins	Smith 1/3	15,500	Sky Sports
19/6/15	Super League XX	19	Salford	H	DW Stadium	W	19-12	Burgess, L.Farrell, Sarginson	Smith 3/3, Smith 1 DG	13,710	-
2/7/15	Super League XX	20	Warrington	A	Halliwell Jones Stadium	L	6-17	Manfredi	Bowen 1/1	10,504	Sky Sports
9/7/15	Super League XX	21	Leeds	H	DW Stadium	W	26-24	L.Farrell, O'Loughlin, Bowen, Charnley	Smith 5/5	15,009	Sky Sports
17/7/15	Super League XX	22	Widnes	H	DW Stadium	W	20-10	Charnley, Burgess, Hampshire, Gelling	Smith 2/4	13,194	-
23/7/15	Super League XX	23	Hull FC	A	KC Stadium	W	48-12	Burgess, Bateman, Powell, Williams, Bowen (2), O'Loughlin, Crosby	Smith 8/8	10,787	Sky Sports

==== Table ====
Pos	Team	Pld	W	D	L	PF	PA	PD	Pts	Qualification
1	Leeds Rhinos	23	16	1	6	758	477	+281	33	Super League Super 8s
2	St Helens	23	16	0	7	598	436	+162	32	Super League Super 8s
3	Wigan Warriors	23	15	1	7	589	413	+176	31	Super League Super 8s
4	Huddersfield Giants	23	13	2	8	538	394	+144	28	Super League Super 8s
5	Castleford Tigers	23	13	0	10	547	505	+42	26	Super League Super 8s
6	Warrington Wolves	23	12	0	11	552	456	+96	24	Super League Super 8s
7	Hull F.C.	23	11	0	12	452	484	−32	22	Super League Super 8s
8	Catalans Dragons	23	9	2	12	561	574	−13	20	Super League Super 8s
9	Widnes Vikings	23	9	1	13	518	565	−47	19	The Qualifiers
10	Hull Kingston Rovers	23	9	0	14	534	646	−112	18	The Qualifiers
11	Salford City Reds	23	8	1	14	447	617	−170	17	The Qualifiers
12	Wakefield Trinity Wildcats	23	3	0	20	402	929	−527	6	The Qualifiers

Source: Rugby League Project
Rules for classification: 1) Points; 2) Points difference; 3) Number of points scored;

=== Super 8's ===
==== Matches ====
Date	Competition	Rnd	Vrs	H/A	Venue	Result	Score	Tries	Goals	Att	Live on TV
6/8/15	Super League XX	S1	Huddersfield	A	Galpharm Stadium	W	30-22	L.Farrell, Manfredi, Williams, Patrick, Crosby	Smith 5/5	11,448	Sky Sports
14/8/15	Super League XX	S2	Leeds	A	Headingley Stadium	L	18-25	L.Farrell (2), Bateman, Manfredi	Smith 0/2, Bowen 1/1	15,026	Sky Sports
21/8/15	Super League XX	S3	Warrington	A	Halliwell Jones Stadium	W	28-0	L.Farrell, Clubb, Bateman (2), Gildart	Bowen 4/5	10,095	Sky Sports
5/9/15	Super League XX	S4	Catalans Dragons	N	The Den	W	42-16	Flower, Bowen (2), Gildart, Charnley, Patrick, Manfredi	Bowen 7/7	8,101	-
11/9/15	Super League XX	S5	Hull FC	H	DW Stadium	W	30-24	Gildart, Charnley, Bateman, Flower, Burgess	Hampshire 5/5	12,028	-
18/9/15	Super League XX	S6	St. Helens	A	Langtree Park	L	14-18	J.Tomkins, Williams	Bowen 3/3	15,808	Sky Sports
25/9/15	Super League XX	S7	Castleford	H	DW Stadium	W	47-12	Manfredi (4), Bowen, Gildart, Williams, Burgess, Patrick	Bowen 5/9, Smith 1 DG	15,070	-

==== Table ====
Pos	Team	Pld	W	D	L	PF	PA	PD	Pts	Qualification
1	Leeds Rhinos (L, C)	30	20	1	9	944	650	+294	41	Semi-finals
2	Wigan Warriors	30	20	1	9	798	530	+268	41	Semi-finals
3	Huddersfield Giants	30	18	2	10	750	534	+216	38	Semi-finals
4	St Helens	30	19	0	11	766	624	+142	38	Semi-finals
5	Castleford Tigers	30	16	0	14	731	746	−15	32	
6	Warrington Wolves	30	15	0	15	714	636	+78	30	
7	Catalans Dragons	30	13	2	15	739	770	−31	28	
8	Hull F.C.	30	12	0	18	620	716	−96	24	

Source: Rugby League Project
(C) Champions; (L) League Leaders' Shield Winners

=== 2015 play-offs ===
Date	Competition	Rnd	Vrs	H/A	Venue	Result	Score	Tries	Goals	Att	Live on TV
1/10/15	Super League XX	Semi Final	Huddersfield	H	DW Stadium	W	32-8	Flower, Bateman (2), Manfredi, Clubb	Bowen 6/6	10,035	Sky Sports
10/10/15	Super League XX	Grand Final	Leeds	N	Old Trafford	L	20-22	Burgess, Manfredi, Bowen	Bowen 4/4	73,512	Sky Sports

=== Player appearances ===
FB=Fullback	C=Centre	W=Winger	SO=Stand-off	SH=Scrum half	PR=Prop	H=Hooker	SR=Second Row	L=Loose forward	B=Bench

No	Player	1	2	3	4	5	6	7	8	9	10	11	12	13	14	15	16	17	18	19	20	21	22	23	S1	S2	S3	S4	S5	S6	S7	SF
1	Matthew Bowen	FB	FB		FB	FB	FB									FB	FB	FB	FB	FB	FB	FB		FB	FB	FB	FB	FB	x	FB	FB	FB
2	Josh Charnley	W	W	W	W	W										W	W	W	W			W	W	W	W	W	W	W	W	W	W	
3	Anthony Gelling	C	C	C	C	C	C	C	C	C	C	C	C								C		C	C	C	C			C	B		
4	Dan Sarginson				C	C	C	C	C	C	C	C	C	C	C	C	C	C	C	C	C	C										
5	Joe Burgess	W	W	W		W	W	W	W	W	W	W	W	W	W	W	W	W	W	W	W	W	W	W					W	W	C	W
6	George Williams	SO		SO	B	B	SO	SO	SO	SO	SO	SO	SO	SO	SO	B	SO	SO	SO	SO	SO	SO	SO	SO	SO	SO	SO	SO	SO	SO	SO	SO
7	Matty Smith	SH	Red card	SH	SH	SH	SH	SH	SH	SH	SH	SH	SH	SH	SH	SH	SH	SH	SH	SH	SH	SH	SH	SH	SH	SH	SH	SH	SH	SH	SH	SH
8	Dom Crosby	P	P								L	P	P	P	P	P	P		B	P	P	P	P	P	P		P	P	P	P	P	P
9	Michael McIlorum		H	H	H	H	H	H	H	H	H	H	H	H	H	H	H	H	H	H	H	H	H	H	H	H		H	H	H	H	H
10	Ben Flower	Red card	Red card	Red card	Red card	Red card	Red card	Red card	Red card	Red card	Red card	B	B	P			B	P	P	P	P	P	B	P		P	P	P	P	P	P	P
11	Joel Tomkins	C	C	C	SR	SR	SR	SR	SR		SR	SR	SR	C	C	C	C	C	C	C	SR	SR	SR	SR	SR	SR	SR	SR	SR	SR	SR	SR
12	Liam Farrell	SR	SR	SR	SR	SR	SR	SR	SR	SR	SR	SR	SR	SR				SR	SR	SR	SR	SR	SR	SR	SR	SR	SR				SR	SR
13	Sean O'Loughlin	L	L												L	L	L	L	L	L		L	L	L	L	L	L	L	x	L	L	L
14	John Bateman	SR	SR	L	L	B	L	L	L	SR	Red card	L	L	SR	SR	SR	SR	SR	SR	SR		C	C	C	C	C	C	C	SR	C		C
15	Iain Thornley					x	x	x	x	x	x	x	x	x	x	x	x	x	x	x	x	x	x	x	x	x	x	x	x	x	x	x
16	Sam Powell	B	SH	B	SO	SO							B	B	B	SO		B	B		B			B	B	B	H	B	B	B	B	B
17	Tony Clubb	B	B	B	P	B	P	P	P	B	B	B	B	B								B	B	B	B	P	B	B	B	B	B	B
18	Warriors Fans	-	-	-	-	-	-	-	-	-	-	-	-	-	-	-	-	-	-	-	-	-	-	-	-	-	-	-	-	-	-	-
20	Ryan Hampshire	x	SO	FB	x	x	x	FB	FB	FB	FB	FB	FB	FB	FB					B			FB				B		FB	x	x	x
22	Dominic Manfredi	x	x	x	W	x	W	W	W	x	W	W	W	W	W					W	W				W	W	W	W	x	x	W	W
23	Lee Mossop			B	P	P	P	P	P	P	P	P	P		P	P	P	P	P	B	B	B	B		P	B	B	B	B	B	B	B
24	Taulima Tautai	B		P	B	B	B	B	B	P	P	B	B	B	B	B	B	B	B	B	B	B	P	B	B			B	L			
25	Larne Patrick	B	B	B	B	L	B	B	B	L	B			L	B	SR	SR	B	B	B	B	B	B		B	B		SR	x	SR	B	B
26	Logan Tomkins	H	B	x	x	x	B	B	B	B	B	B										x	x	x	x	x	x	x	x	x	x	x
27	Lewis Tierney	x	x	x	x	x	x	x	x	W	x	x	x	x	x	x	x	x	x	x	x	x	x	x	x	x	x	x	x	x	x	x
28	Ryan Sutton	P	P	P		P			B	B	B			B	B	B	B	B			L			B		B	B					
29	James Greenwood	x	x	x	B	x	x	x	x	x	x	x	x	x	x	x	x	x	x	x	x	x	x	x	x	x	x	x	x	x	x	x
30	Rhodri Lloyd	x	x	x	x	x	x	x	x	x	x	x	x	x	SR	B	x	x	x	x	x	x	x	x	x	x	x	x	x	x	x	x
31	Connor Farrell	x	B	SR	x	x	B	B	x	B	x	x	x	x	x	x	B	x	x	x	x	x	x	x	x	x	x	x	B	x	x	x
32	Jamie Doran	x	x	x	x	x	x	x	x	x	x	x	x	x	x	x	x	x	x	x	x	x	x	x	x	x	x	x	x	x	x	x
33	Rob Lever	x	x	x	x	x	x	x	x	x	x	x	x	x	x	x	x	x	x	x	x	x	x	x	x	x	x	x	x	x	x	x
34	Oliver Gildart	x	x	x	x	x	x	x	x	x	x	x	x	x	x	x	x	x	x	x	x	x	x	x	x	x	C	C	C	C	C	C
35	Jake Shorrocks	x	x	x	x	x	x	x	x	x	x	x	x	x	x	x	x	x	x	x	x	x	x	x	x	x	x	x	x	x	x	x

= Injured

= Suspended

== Challenge Cup ==
LEGEND
Win
Draw
Loss

Date	Competition	Rnd	Vrs	H/A	Venue	Result	Score	Tries	Goals	Att	TV
15/5/15	Cup	6th	Hull Kingston Rovers	H	DW Stadium	L	12-16	J.Tomkins, Burgess	Smith 2/2	4,677	-

=== Player appearances ===
FB=Fullback	C=Centre	W=Winger	SO=Stand Off	SH=Scrum half	P=Prop	H=Hooker	SR=Second Row	L=Loose forward	B=Bench

No	Player	6
1	Matthew Bowen	
2	Josh Charnley	W
3	Anthony Gelling	
4	Dan Sarginson	C
5	Joe Burgess	W
6	George Williams	SO
7	Matty Smith	SH
8	Dom Crosby	P
9	Michael McIlorum	H
10	Ben Flower	
11	Joel Tomkins	C
12	Liam Farrell	SR
13	Sean O'Loughlin	L
14	John Bateman	SR
15	Ian Thornley	x
16	Sam Powell	B
17	Tony Clubb	
18	Warriors Fans	x
20	Ryan Hampshire	FB
22	Dominic Manfredi	x
23	Lee Mossop	P
24	Taulima Tautai	B
25	Larne Patrick	B
26	Logan Tomkins	x
27	Lewis Tierney	x
28	Ryan Sutton	B
29	James Greenwood	x
30	Rhodri Lloyd	x
31	Connor Farrell	x
32	Jamie Doran	x
33	Rob Lever	x
34	Oliver Gildart	x
35	Jake Shorrocks	x

== Squad statistics ==
- Appearances and points include (Super League, Challenge Cup and play-offs) as of 10 October 2015.

No	Player	Position	Age	Previous club	Apps	Tries	Goals	DG	Points
1	Matthew Bowen	Fullback	N/A	North Queensland Cowboys	22	9	31	0	98
2	Josh Charnley	Winger	N/A	Wigan Warriors Academy	21	10	0	0	40
3	Anthony Gelling	Centre	N/A	Auckland Vulcans	20	8	0	0	32
4	Dan Sarginson	Centre	N/A	London Broncos	20	8	0	0	32
5	Joe Burgess	Wing	N/A	Wigan Warriors Academy	29	26	0	0	104
6	George Williams	Stand off	N/A	Wigan Warriors Academy	33	8	0	0	32
7	Matty Smith	Scrum half	N/A	Salford Red Devils	33	4	78	4	176
8	Dom Crosby	Prop	N/A	Wigan Warriors Academy	25	4	1	0	18
9	Michael McIlorum	Hooker	N/A	Wigan Warriors Academy	32	2	0	0	8
10	Ben Flower	Prop	N/A	Crusaders	19	3	0	0	12
11	Joel Tomkins	Second row	N/A	Saracens (Rugby Union)	33	8	0	0	32
12	Liam Farrell	Second row	N/A	Wigan Warriors Academy	28	13	0	0	52
13	Sean O'Loughlin	Loose forward	N/A	Wigan Warriors Academy	20	2	0	0	8
14	John Bateman	Second row	N/A	Bradford Bulls	31	9	0	0	36
15	Iain Thornley	Centre	N/A	Sale Sharks (Rugby Union)	0	0	0	0	0
16	Sam Powell	Scrum half	N/A	Wigan Warriors Academy	23	1	0	0	4
17	Tony Clubb	Centre	N/A	London Broncos	26	2	1	0	10
18	Warriors Fans	-	-	-	-	-	-	-	-
20	Ryan Hampshire	Fullback	N/A	Wigan Warriors Academy	15	4	12	0	40
22	Dominic Manfredi	Wing	N/A	Wigan Warriors Academy	18	22	0	0	88
23	Lee Mossop	Prop	N/A	Parramatta Eels	29	3	0	0	12
24	Taulima Tautai	Loose forward	N/A	Wakefield Trinity Wildcats	27	1	0	0	4
25	Larne Patrick	Second row	N/A	Huddersfield Giants	29	4	0	0	16
26	Logan Tomkins	Hooker	N/A	Wigan Warriors Academy	9	0	0	0	0
27	Lewis Tierney	Fullback	N/A	Wigan Warriors Academy	1	0	0	0	0
28	Ryan Sutton	Prop	N/A	Wigan Warriors Academy	18	1	0	0	4
29	James Greenwood	Prop	N/A	South Wales Scorpions	1	0	0	0	0
30	Rhodri Lloyd	Prop	N/A	South Wales Scorpions	2	0	0	0	0
31	Connor Farrell	Second row	N/A	Wigan Warriors Academy	7	0	0	0	0
32	Jamie Doran	Stand off	N/A	Wigan Warriors Academy	0	0	0	0	0
33	Rob Lever	Loose forward	N/A	Wigan Warriors Academy	0	0	0	0	0
34	Oliver Gildart	Centre	N/A	Wigan Warriors Academy	7	4	0	0	16
35	Jake Shorrocks	Scrum half	N/A	Wigan Warriors Academy	0	0	0	0	0

= Injured = Suspended

== Transfers ==
In

Player	Previous club	Contract	Date signed
(Samoa) Taulima Tautai	Wakefield Trinity Wildcats	3 Years	May 2014
(England) Joel Tomkins	Saracens Rugby	4 ½ Years	June 2014
(Wales) Rhodri Lloyd	Widnes Vikings	Loan return	September 2014
(England) Logan Tomkins	Salford Red Devils	Loan return	September 2014
(England) James Greenwood	London Broncos	Loan return	September 2014
(Wales) Larne Patrick	Huddersfield Giants	1 Year Loan	November 2014
(England) Lee Mossop	Parramatta Eels	3 Years	November 2014

Out

Player	Signed for	Contract length	Date announced
(Wales) Andy Powell	Retired	N/A	June 2014
(Australia) Blake Green	Melbourne Storm	3 Years	June 2014
(England) Darrell Goulding	Hull Kingston Rovers	3 Years	July 2014
(England) Jack Murphy	Workington Town	2 Years	October 2014
(England) Grant Beecham	Swinton Lions	2 Years	October 2014
(England) Ryan Powell	Swinton Lions	2 Years	November 2014
(England) Ben Austin	Swinton Lions	1 Year	November 2014
(England) Jack Hughes	Huddersfield Giants	1 Year Loan	November 2014
(England) Greg Burke	Hull Kingston Rovers	1 Year Loan	November 2014
(England) Scott Taylor	Salford Red Devils	1 Year Loan	November 2014
(Wales) Jordan James	Swinton Lions / Wigan Youth Performance Coach	1 Year	December 2014
(Wales) Gil Dudson	Widnes Vikings	2 Years	January 2015
(United States) Eddy Pettybourne	Gold Coast Titans	2 Years	January 2015
