= 2016 Super League Grand Final =

Warrington Wolves	Wigan Warriors
6	12
	1	2	Total
WAR	6	0	6
WIG	2	10	12
- Date: 8 October 2016
- Stadium: Old Trafford
- Location: (England) Manchester
- Harry Sunderland Trophy: (England) Liam Farrell ( Wigan Warriors)
- Headliners: Feeder
- Referee: Robert Hicks
- Attendance: 70,202

Broadcast partners
- Broadcasters: Sky Sports
- Commentators: Eddie Hemmings

The 2016 Super League Grand Final was the 19th official grand final and conclusive and championship-deciding match of the Super League XXI season. It was held on Saturday 8 October 2016, at Old Trafford, Manchester, with a 6pm kick-off time. British rock band Feeder provided the pre-match and half-time entertainment. The Wigan Warriors were crowned champions, winning their fourth Super League crown, and prevented Warrington from winning their first championship in 61 years.

== Background ==
Pos	Team	Pld	W	D	L	PF	PA	PD	Pts
1	Warrington Wolves	30	21	1	8	944	650	+311	43
2	Wigan Warriors	30	21	0	9	669	560	+109	42

=== Route to the Final ===
==== Warrington Wolves ====
Warrington took part in the Challenge Cup final, when they went down 12–10 against Hull FC. Then in the rematch of the final, Warrington won 23–6 to win the League Leader's Shield. They then beat St. Helens for only the 2nd time at the Halliwell Jones Stadium to clinch the first Final spot.

==== Wigan Warriors ====
Wigan were quieter than usual this season, however in the back end of the season Wigan fought back to finish second by beating Hull F.C. and Warrington Wolves away. Drawn at home to Hull F.C. at the semi-final Wigan won 28–18 to set up the final against Warrington.

== Match day ==
=== Pre-game ===
The match was a rematch of the 2013 Super League Grand Final, where Wigan won the trophy after trailing at half-time. This is Wigan's fourth consecutive Grand Final appearance. Warrington have been in the Grand Final twice before and have never won the Super League trophy, with their last league trophy win coming 61 years ago in the 1954–55 Northern Rugby Football League season.

Wigan were underdogs coming into this match as a host of their regular players were missing through injury. Players such as Sam and Joel Tomkins, Michael McIlorum, Dominic Manfredi, and Lee Mossop. Skipper Sean O'Loughlin was also amongst this list but was rushed into the team for the Grand Final and was placed on the bench after two 'successful' training sessions. Warrington's Chris Sandow was also a late inclusion for the Grand Final after he recovered enough to play, however he also started the game on the reserves bench.

This was the last rugby league match for Wigan's Josh Charnley before heading off to play rugby union. Teammate, Lewis Tierney, son of 1998 Super League Grand Final winner and dual-international, Jason Robinson, created history by becoming the first son to play in a Grand Final after his father did. Notably, Oliver Gildart's father Ian Gildart had also won various silverware with Wigan, but this was prior to the Super League era.

== Match details ==
8 October 2016

Warrington Wolves	6–12	Wigan Warriors
Tries: Patton 21'; Goals: Patton (1/1) 22'		Tries: Gildart 55'; Charnley 63'; Goals: Smith (2/4) 8', 74'

Old Trafford, Manchester
Attendance: 70,202
Referee: Robert Hicks (Oldham)

Warrington Wolves		Position	Wigan Warriors	
6	(England) Stefan Ratchford	Fullback	4	(England) Dan Sarginson
2	(England) Tom Lineham	Wing	2	(England) Josh Charnley
3	(Wales) Rhys Evans	Centre	3	(Cook Islands) Anthony Gelling
4	(England) Ryan Atkins	Centre	20	(England) Oliver Gildart
5	(Scotland) Matty Russell	Wing	22	(Scotland) Lewis Tierney
1	(Australia) Kurt Gidley	Stand-off	6	(England) George Williams
26	(England) Declan Patton	Scrum-half	7	(England) Matty Smith
10	(Fiji) Ashton Sims	Prop	24	(New Zealand) Frank-Paul Nu'uausala
9	(England) Daryl Clark	Hooker	16	(England) Sam Powell
8	(England) Chris Hill (c)	Prop	10	(Wales) Ben Flower
12	(England) Jack Hughes	Second-row	12	(England) Liam Farrell
27	(England) Sam Wilde	Second-row	14	(England) John Bateman
14	(England) Joe Westerman	Loose forward	25	(Samoa) Willie Isa
7	(Australia) Chris Sandow	Interchange	8	(England) Dom Crosby
18	(England) George King	Interchange	13	(England) Sean O'Loughlin (c)
24	(England) Toby King	Interchange	19	(Australia) Taulima Tautai
33	(England) Ryan Bailey	Interchange	21	(England) Ryan Sutton
	(Australia) Tony Smith	Coach		(England) Shaun Wane

=== First half ===
Wigan opened the scoring in the 8th minute with a penalty goal from Matty Smith due to teammate, John Bateman, being held too long in a tackle.

In the 17th minute, Wigan dotted the ball on the line out wide with Charnley, however the try wasn't awarded, due to a flick from Gelling which went forward due to pressure from Warrington's defence. This was Wigan's only notable effort in the first half as errors, such as this one, from both teams cost them opportunities.

However, in the 21st minute, Warrington did score, thanks to a try from Declan Patton, who was only making his 9th appearance of the season. He then converted his own try to give his team a 6–2 lead, which they'd hold onto until half-time.

=== Second half ===
In the 54th minute, Ryan Atkins made his way over the try-line for Warrington. However, referee Robert Hicks sent the final decision to Video Referee Ben Thaler, as he couldn't see whether or not the ball was grounded on the try-line, after 5 Wigan players were tackling Atkins. Eventually after a short delay, Hicks' initial TRY decision was overturned by video referee, Ben Thaler, due to Atkins seen losing control of the ball before he could get it down.

A minute later, Liam Farrell broke Warrington's defensive line, and then gave a pass off to Oliver Gildart, who'd go on to score the 100th Super League Grand Final try. After kicking from a wide angle, Matty Smith was unable to convert and the scores remained level.

In the 63rd minute, Josh Charnley wasn't denied this time around, scoring after grounding the departing team member Dan Sarginson's grubber in the in-goal area. Matty Smith again had to convert from out wide, but he again failed to capitalise on the extra 2 points.

Smith then finally added another two points, courtesy of a penalty goal, conceded by Daryl Clark. The penalty-goal made the score 12–6 to Wigan with only 6 minutes remaining. After this moment, all the chances belonged to Warrington, but Wigan's defence stood up when it mattered most, tackling players out of play and tackling them on the 5th tackle, to create a turnover each time. Wigan held on to win their 4th Super League title.

=== Post-match ===
Wigan's victory was their fourth Super League title.

Liam Farrell won the Harry Sunderland Trophy.

The match was also the last for Sky Sports commentator, and former Great Britain international, Mike Stephenson, after 26 years of commentating the sport.

== World Club Series ==
By winning this match Wigan had qualified for the World Club Series Final, to be played at DW Stadium against the winners of the 2016 NRL Grand Final, the Cronulla-Sutherland Sharks. Warrington, as the runners up, would play 2016 NRL Grand Final runners up Melbourne Storm at the Halliwell Jones Stadium. The third game would have seen Challenge Cup champions Hull F.C. take on Canberra Raiders at KCOM Stadium. However circumstances later dictated that only Wigan and Warrington would play games, against Cronulla and Brisbane Broncos respectively.
