= 2018 Super League Grand Final =

Wigan Warriors	Warrington Wolves
12	4
	1	2	Total
WIG	8	4	12
WAR	4	0	4
- Date: 13 October 2018
- Stadium: Old Trafford
- Location: (England) Manchester
- Harry Sunderland Trophy: (England) Stefan Ratchford ( Warrington Wolves)
- Headliners: Blossoms
- Referee: Robert Hicks
- Attendance: 64,892

Broadcast partners
- Broadcasters: Sky Sports
- Commentators: Eddie Hemmings; Terry O'Connor; Barrie McDermott; Phil Clarke; Stuart Cummings Bill Arthur

The 2018 Super League Grand Final was the 21st official grand final and championship-deciding game of Super League XXIII. It was held at Old Trafford in Manchester on 13 October 2018, kick off 18.00. The final was contested by Warrington Wolves and Wigan Warriors, the third time the two sides have met in the Grand Final with previous meetings in 2013 and 2016 being won by Wigan.

== Background ==
Pos	Team	Pld	W	D	L	PF	PA	PD	Pts
2	Wigan Warriors	30	23	0	7	740	417	+323	46
4	Warrington Wolves	30	18	1	11	767	561	+206	37

=== Route to the Final ===
==== Wigan Warriors ====
Wigan finished 2nd in regular season and seven wins out of seven in the Super 8's saw them secure 2nd place in the table. A 14–0 victory over third placed Castleford Tigers in the semi-final earned Wigan a place in their 10th Grand Final.

==== Warrington Wolves ====
Warrington finished 4th to earn an away trip to League Leaders Shield winners St. Helens in the semi-finals. Warrington Wolves won 18–13 with a late try by Tom Lineham. Warrington Wolves contested their 4th Grand Final.

== Match details ==
12 October 2019

Wigan Warriors	12-4	Warrington Wolves
Tries: Manfredi 26', 77'; Davies 30'		Tries: Charnley 12'

Old Trafford, Manchester
Attendance: 64,892
Referee: Robert Hicks (Oldham)

Wigan Warriors		Position	Warrington Wolves	
1	(England) Sam Tomkins	Fullback	1	(England) Stefan Ratchford
21	(England) Dominic Manfredi	Wing	2	(England) Tom Lineham
4	(England) Oliver Gildart	Centre	3	(Australia) Bryson Goodwin
3	(England) Dan Sarginson	Centre	19	(England) Toby King
2	(England) Tom Davies	Wing	27	(England) Josh Charnley
6	(England) George Williams	Stand-off	6	(England) Kevin Brown
9	(New Zealand) Thomas Leuluai	Scrum-half	7	(Australia) Tyrone Roberts
25	(France) Romain Navarette	Prop	8	(England) Chris Hill
7	(England) Sam Powell	Hooker	9	(England) Daryl Clark
10	(Wales) Ben Flower	Prop	10	(England) Mike Cooper
40	(England) Joe Greenwood	Second-row	30	(New Zealand) Bodene Thompson
14	(England) John Bateman	Second-row	12	(England) Jack Hughes
13	(England) Sean O'Loughlin	Loose forward	34	(England) Ben Westwood
20	(France) Morgan Escare	Interchange	17	(England) Joe Philbin
19	(England) Ryan Sutton	Interchange	13	(Tonga) Ben Murdoch-Masila
12	(England) Liam Farrell	Interchange	19	(England) George King
8	(England) Tony Clubb	Interchange	15	(England) Declan Patton
	(England) Shaun Wane	Coach		(Australia) Steve Price

First Half

Warrington opened the scoring in a cagey first half on 13 minutes, through Josh Charnley, against his former club, as he took in Stefan Ratchford's looping pass before sliding over in the corner. The touchline conversion was missed by Tyrone Roberts. (0–4) Wigan leveled the score on 25 minutes through Dominic Manfredi, marking his first Grand Final appearance since 2015, (missing the 2016 Final due to injury) with a try in the corner, through great work by Oliver Gildart, as he jinked through the line, before giving it to Manfredi out wide to touch down in the corner. (4-4). Sam Tomkins missed the conversion, and the score would remain level.

On 31 minutes, a George Williams kick into open space, rolled into the in goal area, and Tom Davies managed to beat Josh Charnley to the ball, and score in the corner. The video referee awarded the try after reviewing the footage, and agreed Davies had got a hand on the ball. Again, Tomkins missed the extras and it would remain 8-4 until half time.

Second Half

The second half would see Warrington come close early on, as Tom Lineham looked to go over in the corner, but a mob of Wigan defenders led by Manfredi and Tomkins forced him into touch. With time running out, Wigan won a penalty on 70 minutes and despite being close to the halfway line, they elected to kick it. Tomkins again missed the kick and the score remained 8–4. On 77 minutes, Manfredi would seal the win for Wigan as he would take in Sam Tomkins' inch perfect pass, before diving over in the corner, to seal the win. Tomkins again missing the conversion, (12-4). Toby King almost got what would have been a consolation score for Warrington in the last minute of the game, but the video ref determined that he'd dropped the ball in his attempt at scoring and the score would remain 12–4.

The win for Wigan Warriors secured a record 22nd Rugby league title while Warrington's 63 years wait to be crowned champions goes on.

Post-Match

This match was Shaun Wane's last game as Wigan coach before going to Scotland Rugby Union, after 7 seasons as head coach of Wigan. It was also the last game before Sam Tomkins left for Catalans, and John Bateman and Ryan Sutton for Canberra. Wigan would win their 5th Grand Final and 22nd Championship overall, in their 10th appearance, evening up their win–loss record in Grand Finals, their last three wins coming against Warrington, whilst Warrington are still waiting to end their long title drought, stretching back to 1955.
