= Stefan Ratchford =

England international rugby league footballer

Stef Ratchford
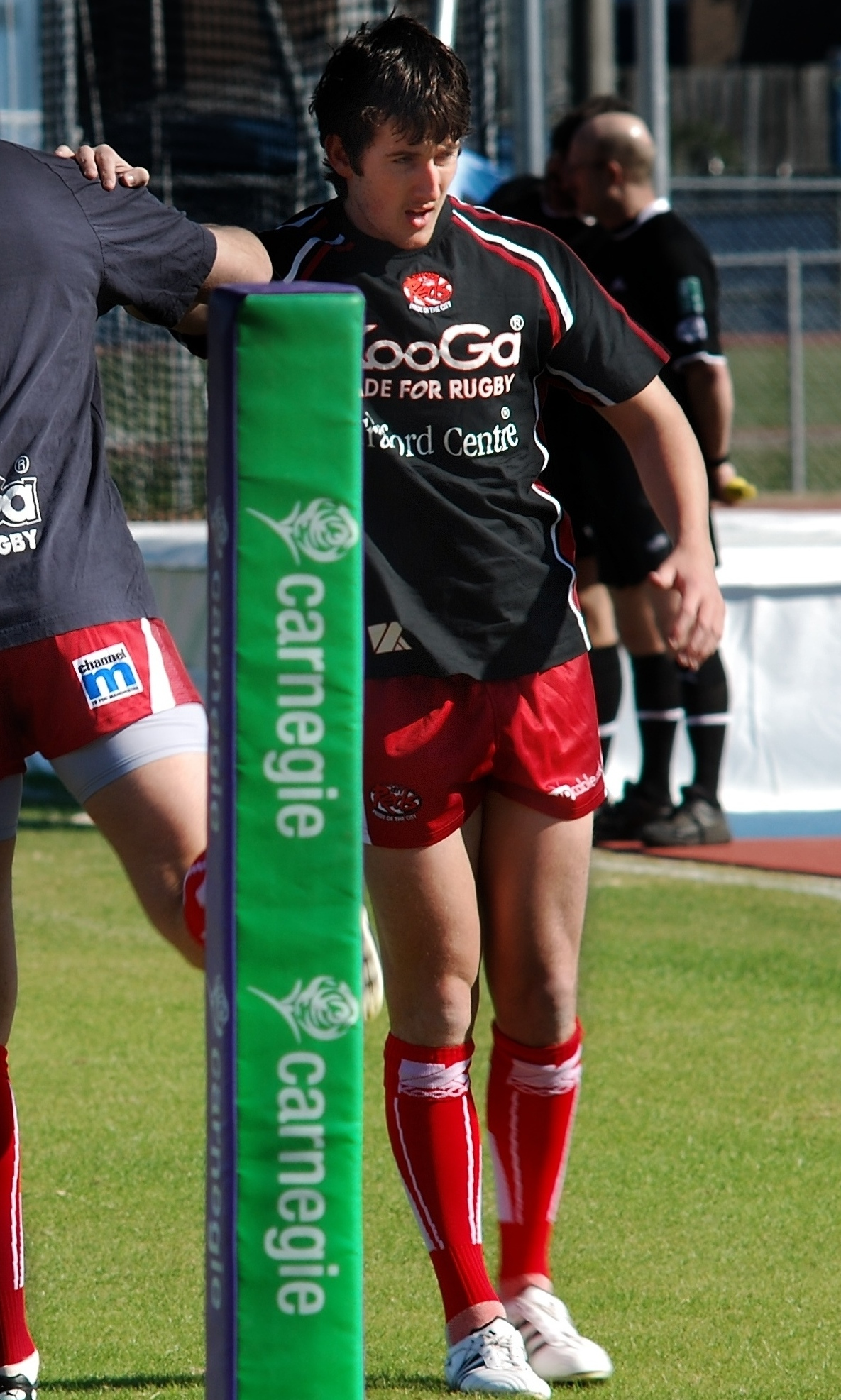

Personal information
- Full name: Stefan Guy Ratchford
- Born: 19 July 1988 (age 37) Wigan, Greater Manchester, England
- Height: 6 ft 1 in (1.85 m)
- Weight: 13 st 8 lb (86 kg)

Playing information
- Position: Fullback, Stand-off, Centre, Scrum-half
Club
Years	Team	Pld	T	G	FG	P
2007–11	Salford City Reds	108	40	29	0	218
2012–25	Warrington Wolves	359	95	650	2	1738
	Total	467	135	679	2	1956
Representative
Years	Team	Pld	T	G	FG	P
2011–12	England Knights	2	3	4		20
2016–18	England	6	2	0	0	8
- Source: As of 8 October 2025

Stefan Guy Ratchford (born 19 July 1988) is an English retired rugby league footballer who last played as a fullback for the Warrington Wolves in the Super League and the England Knights and England international at international level.

He previously played for the Salford City Reds between 2007 and 2011 in the Super League and National League One. Throughout his career Ratchford played as a fullback, wing, centre, stand-off, scrum-half, hooker and loose forward.

== Background ==
Stefan Ratchford was born in Wigan, Greater Manchester, England.

He started playing rugby league at the age of six, initially playing junior rugby for Wigan St Cuthberts before later switching to Wigan St Patricks.

== Club career ==
=== Salford Red Devils ===
Ratchford signed with Salford City Reds in 2005, and made his first team début for the club in 2007 in a fourth round Challenge Cup match against Gateshead Thunder.

In 2008, following the club's relegation to National League One, Ratchford established himself as a regular first team player. He formed an effective halfback partnership alongside Richie Myler, helping the team win the Northern Rail Cup, and the Division One Grand Final.

=== Warrington Wolves ===
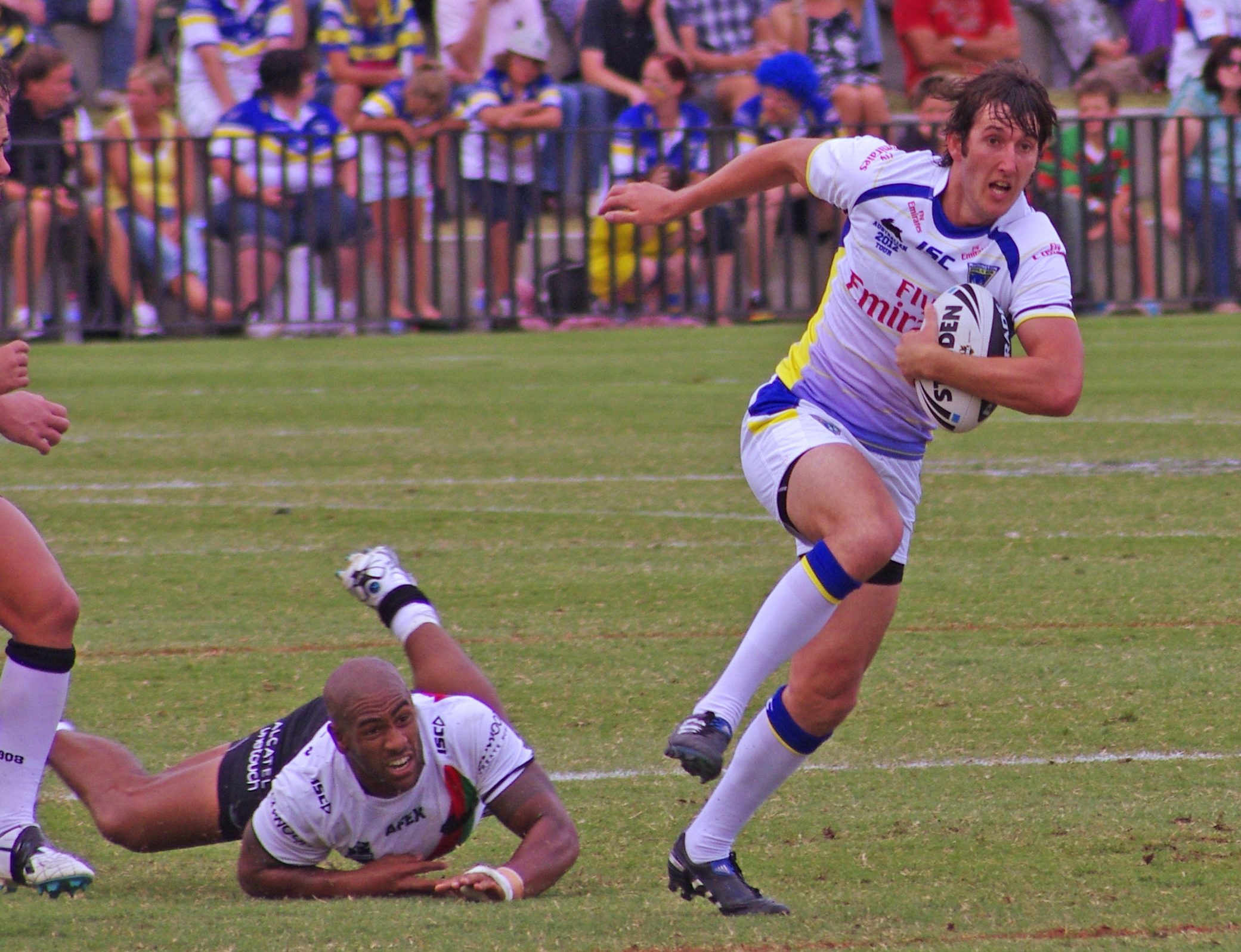
Ratchford (right) playing for Warrington Wolves in January 2012

Ratchford played in the 2012 Challenge Cup Final victory over Leeds at Wembley Stadium.

Ratchford played in the 2012 Super League Grand Final defeat by Leeds at Old Trafford.

Ratchford played in the 2013 Super League Grand Final defeat by Wigan at Old Trafford.

Ratchford signed a new deal in 2014 keeping him at the Warrington club until 2018.

Ratchford played in the 2016 Super League Grand Final defeat by Wigan at Old Trafford.

Ratchford played in the 2018 Challenge Cup Final defeat by the Catalans Dragons at Wembley Stadium. During Warrington's defeat by Wigan in the 2018 Super League Grand Final Ratchford was voted winner of the Harry Sunderland Trophy making him only the fourth recipient of the award to have played for the losing side.

Ratchford played in the 2018 Super League Grand Final defeat by Wigan at Old Trafford.

Ratchford played in the 2019 Challenge Cup Final victory over St. Helens at Wembley Stadium. In round 8 of the 2021 Super League season, he scored a try and kicked 11 goals in Warrington's 62–18 victory over Salford. Ratchford played 28 games for Warrington in the 2023 Super League season as Warrington finished sixth on the table and qualified for the playoffs. Ratchford played in the clubs elimination playoff loss against St Helens. On 28 March 2024, Ratchford set a new goal kicking record in the Super League converting his 40th goal in a row. Warrington would win the match 58-4 over the hapless London side.

In July 2024, Ratchford suffering a fractured eyesocket and jaw during a game against St Helens ruling him out for eight weeks. The injury resulted in him being unable to eat or talk for the first month of his recovery. On 7 June 2025, Ratchford played in Warrington's 8-6 Challenge Cup final loss against Hull Kingston Rovers. Ratchford played 19 games for Warrington in the 2025 Super League season as they missed the playoffs finishing 8th on the table. Ratchford announced that he would be retiring following the conclusion of the 2025 Super League season.

== International career ==
Ratchford was named in the England squad for 2009 Four Nations, but did not appear in any games during the tournament. At the end of the 2011 season, Ratchford rejected a new contract offer from Salford and joined Warrington Wolves. He also made two appearances for the England Knights in 2011 and 2012.

In October 2017 he was selected in the England squad for the 2017 Rugby League World Cup.

== Personal life ==
In 2015, Ratchford set up a business with former Salford City Reds teammate Matty Smith called Future Stars, which runs coaching sessions for junior rugby league players.

== Honours ==
- Challenge Cup
  - Winners (2): 2012 2019
- League Leaders' Shield
  - Winners (1): 2016
