= Taulima Tautai =

Australian rugby league footballer

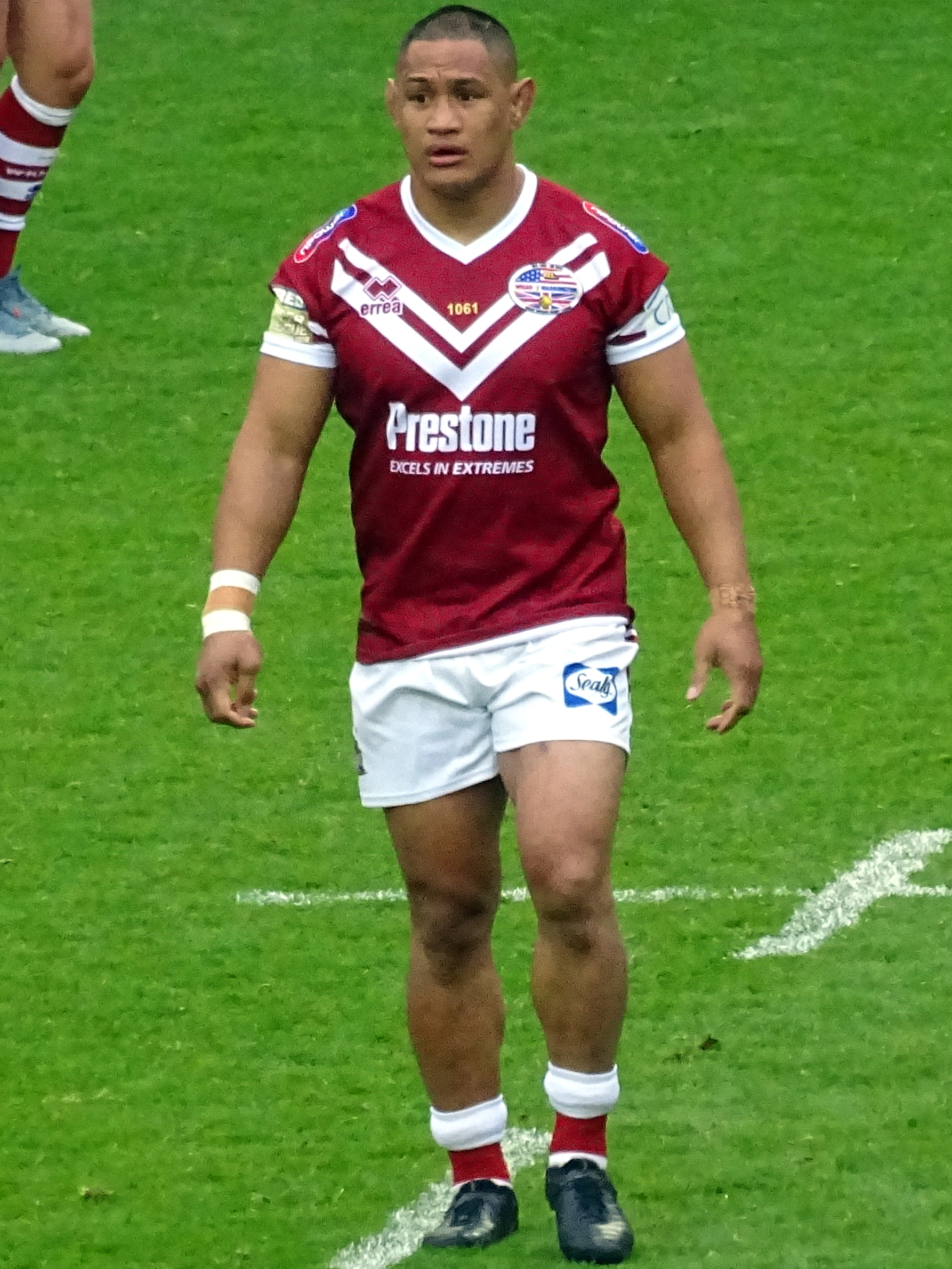

Personal information
- Born: 3 April 1988 (age 38) Sydney, New South Wales, Australia

Playing information
- Height: 190 cm (6 ft 3 in)
- Weight: 116 kg (18 st 4 lb)
- Position: Prop, Second-row, Lock, Centre, Wing
Club
Years	Team	Pld	T	G	FG	P
2008–09	Parramatta Eels	30	9	0	0	36
2010–11	Cronulla Sharks	33	4	0	0	16
2012–13	Parramatta Eels	9	1	0	0	4
2013–14	Wakefield Trinity Wildcats	26	2	0	0	8
2015–19	Wigan Warriors	133	4	0	0	16
	Total	231	20	0	0	80

Taulima Tautai born 3 April 1988 is an Australian former professional rugby league footballer, who has most recently played as a prop for the Wigan Warriors in the Super League. He previously played for the Cronulla-Sutherland Sharks, Parramatta Eels and the Wakefield Trinity Wildcats.

== Background ==
Born in Sydney, New South Wales, Australia. Tautai attended St Gregory's College, Campbelltown.

Taulima played his junior rugby league for CVD Edensor Park Cobras, before being signed by the Parramatta Eels.

== Playing career ==
Tautai's position of choice was originally in the centres or on the wing.

He made his first-grade début for the Parramatta Eels in round 1 of the 2008 NRL season, going on to play 30 games for the club between 2008 and 2009. Tautai won Parramatta Eels' rookie of the season award in 2008.

Although born in Sydney, Tautai is of Samoan and New Zealand descent. Because of his heritage, he was named in the Samoan and New Zealand training squads for the 2008 World Cup. However, he suffered an injury and did not make the final squad for either nation.

Tautai played 33 games for the Cronulla-Sutherland Sharks between 2010 and 2011.

He returned to the Parramatta Eels in 2012 but injury and form kept him to only 9 appearances. Tautai was part of the Parramatta side that finished last in the competition that year which was the first time the club had finished last since 1972.

Tautai joined the Wakefield Trinity Wildcats in the Super League for the 2013 and 2014 seasons, playing in 22 matches.

Tautai joined the Wigan Warriors in November 2014, signing a three-year deal.

He played from the bench in the 2016 Super League Grand Final victory over the Warrington Wolves at Old Trafford.

He played in the 2017 Challenge Cup Final defeat by Hull F.C. at Wembley Stadium.

In 2018, he played over 20 matches for the season, but was not selected in the finals series, and was not a part of the 2018 Super League Grand Final final winning side. Tautai left the Wigan Warriors in June 2019 following a drink-driving conviction.

Whilst Tautai was known mostly for his Rugby career, he took place in charity and community work off the field. He donated his 2016 Grand Final ring to a local Wigan family to assist them in raising money for the SANDs charity. A Charity that looks after family who have lost their babies. Alongside his wife, they started the Wigan Warriors Campaign 'Respect Her' after working with the Women's Refuge to draw attention to issues within the local community. Tautai also shaved off his long locks to raise money for suicide awareness in honour of his mother-in-law 'The Jenny Project'.

On 30 June 2019, he announced that he would be retiring from rugby league.
