= 2015 Super League Grand Final =

Leeds Rhinos	Wigan Warriors
22	20
	1	2	Total
LEE	16	6	22
WIG	6	14	20
- Date: 10 October 2015
- Stadium: Old Trafford
- Location: (England) Manchester
- Harry Sunderland Trophy: (England) Danny McGuire ( Leeds Rhinos)
- Headliners: The Charlatans
- Referee: Ben Thaler
- Attendance: 73,512

Broadcast partners
- Broadcasters: Sky Sports
- Commentators: Eddie Hemmings; Mike Stephenson; Brian Carney, Phil Clarke, Barrie McDermott, Terry O'Connor, Stuart Cummings

The 2015 Super League Grand Final was the 18th official grand final and conclusive and championship-deciding match of the Super League XX season. It was held on Saturday 10 October 2015, at Old Trafford, Manchester, with a 6pm kick-off time. The sellout crowd of 73,512 at Old Trafford set a new Super League Grand Final attendance record, eclipsing the previous record of 72,575 established at the 2006 Super League Grand Final. British indie rock band The Charlatans headlined the pre-match and half-time entertainment.

The Leeds Rhinos were crowned champions after defeating the Wigan Warriors by 22-20. This meant that Leeds completed the treble by winning all of the major English domestic trophies - The Challenge Cup, the League Leaders' Shield and the Super League Grand Final.

== Background ==
Pos	Team	Pld	W	D	L	PF	PA	PD	Pts
1	Leeds Rhinos	30	20	1	9	944	650	+294	41
2	Wigan Warriors	30	20	1	9	798	530	+268	41

=== Route to the Final ===
==== Wigan Warriors ====
Wigan finished the regular Super League season in second place after beating Castleford 47-12 at the DW Stadium, as Leeds winger Ryan Hall scored a try on the hooter in a 20-16 victory over Huddersfield to claim the 2015 League Leaders' Shield. Wigan then hosted Huddersfield in the Super League play off semi-final and defeated them 32-8 to reach their third consecutive Super League Grand Final.

==== Leeds Rhinos ====
Leeds finished the regular Super League season on top of the table to claim the League Leaders' Shield. In the Super League play off semi-final, Leeds hosted St. Helens at Headingley and won 20-13 to reach their first Super League Grand Final since 2012.

== Match day ==
=== Pre-game ===
The match was a rematch of the 1998 Super League Grand Final, the first ever, where Wigan won the trophy.

Before the match, 7 players of the field were playing their last game for their club. For Kevin Sinfield, Jamie Peacock and Kylie Leuluai (Leeds) it was their last game of professional rugby league before retirement. For Matty Bowen it was his last game for Wigan before leaving the club as a free agent. Rugby League legend Kevin Sinfield (Leeds) was also leaving the code to switch to rugby union next year, while Joe Burgess (Wigan) was heading off to the NRL and Larne Patrick (Wigan) would return to the Huddersfield Giants next season after his loan spell would finish. So it was a question in the media as to which team would farewell their players with happy memories, Leeds? Or Wigan?

== Match details ==
10 October 2015
18:00 BST

Leeds Rhinos	22–20	Wigan Warriors
Tries: McGuire 6', 35'; Moon 28'; Walters 64'; Goals: Sinfield 7', 36', 65'	(Report)	Tries: Burgess 4'; Manfredi 46'; Bowen 49'; Goals: Bowen 5', 47', 50', 62'

Old Trafford, Manchester
Attendance: 73,512
Referee: Ben Thaler
Player of the Match: Danny McGuire

Leeds Rhinos		Position	Wigan Warriors	
1	(England) Zak Hardaker	Fullback	1	(Australia) Matthew Bowen
2	(England) Tom Briscoe	Wing	22	(England) Dominic Manfredi
3	(England) Kallum Watkins	Centre	14	(England) John Bateman
4	(Australia) Joel Moon	Centre	34	(England) Oliver Gildart
5	(England) Ryan Hall	Wing	5	(England) Joe Burgess
13	(England) Kevin Sinfield (c)	Stand-off	6	(England) George Williams
6	(England) Danny McGuire	scrum-half	7	(England) Matty Smith
30	(Australia) Mitch Garbutt	Prop	8	(England) Dom Crosby
7	(England) Rob Burrow	Hooker	9	(Ireland) Michael McIlorum
10	(England) Jamie Peacock	Prop	10	(Wales) Ben Flower
15	(Australia) Brett Delaney	Second-row	11	(England) Joel Tomkins
12	(England) Carl Ablett	Second-row	12	(England) Liam Farrell
19	(Ireland) Brad Singleton	loose forward	13	(England) Sean O'Loughlin (c)
8	(New Zealand) Kylie Leuluai	Interchange	16	(England) Sam Powell
17	(England) Adam Cuthbertson	Interchange	17	(England) Tony Clubb
20	(Germany) Jimmy Keinhorst	Interchange	23	(England) Lee Mossop
21	(England) Josh Walters	Interchange	25	(Wales) Larne Patrick
(England) Brian McDermott		Coach	(England) Shaun Wane	

=== First half ===
In the 4th minute, Wigan played the ball 29 metres out from their own goal-line on the fourth tackle, when they decided to shift the ball using their players that were outnumbering the Leeds right side defence. Two passes behind, the decoy running prop forwards then found Liam Farrell who managed to find a gap, running at Hardaker, and then passed the ball just as soon as Hardaker was about to tackle him. the ball then hit a flying Burgess, who broke out of a desperate dive from a trailing Kallum Watkins, to opening the scoring in the match like they have in their past six matches.

Right from the next kickoff, Matty Smith dropped the ball 11 metres away from his own team's try line. From the resulting scrum, Leeds would eventually score off a Kevin Sinfield grubber kick, that Danny McGuire delightfully dived on cleanly to score Leeds' first points in the final.

In the 28th minute, possibly for some, it was a controversial try, because a long Video Referee decision showed visuals that was difficult to tell if Danny McGuire lost the ball, as it illustrates 'unconvincingly' on some camera angles and lost it sideways 'unconvincingly' on others. However, Video Referee(s) Phil Bentham and Richard Silverwood were initially told that it was a TRY when Ben Thaler sent it upstairs for them to check. There was no problem with Joel Moon's simple run in grounding though. Finally, after 2 minutes and 40 seconds the two video referees couldn't see 'conclusive' evidence to overturn Ben Thaler's initial decision to disallow the T-R-Y, and the TRY was awarded.

In the 35th minute, Leeds played the ball on halfway, on the 4th tackle and went on to make a line break out wide after Cuthbertson did what he does best, which is creating second phase play. His offload found Burrow who quickly gave it on to McGuire, who fired a ball over the top out wide to Briscoe, who was in acres of space after Burgess was standing way too far back. He ran it at Burgess and then passed the ball to Watkins, who would then pass the ball back inside, when he realised he was caught behind from a defender. The man running back inside was McGuire who would go over to score his second try of the game, making him the highest scorer of tries in Super Leagues Grand Finals.

=== Second half ===
Wigan started this half the better as well as they scored first this time 5 minutes in. The ball was played on the far left hand wing 2 metres out. Burgess passed the ball from dummy half to the five-eighth Williams who was having an off game so far but made amends when he ran at the defensive line stepped one defender and flicked the ball out the back perfectly to O'Loughlin who put up a high bomb to Ryan Hall's wing. Hall caught the ball in mid air but had it stripped by Dom Manfredi before landing on the ground. Manfredi went on to dive over the line for a try, converted by Bowen. 16-12 to Leeds.

On the 49th minute Wigan played the ball 20 metres out from the Leeds try-line. Matty Smith ran at the defence before passing it behind to Matty Bowen who was slowly tingling his feet and then he performed magic, weaving his way through the Leeds line, creating gaps and breaking tackles which would make him go on to score under the sticks on what the Wigan faithful would hope to be the fairy tale moment for him and his Wigan team in the Grand-Final, converted by Bowen. Wigan hit the front again 16-18. Keinhorst on.

In the 61st minute Wigan were awarded a penalty, McIlorum deliberately throws the ball into a crouching offside Watkins - Gamesmanship. 31 metres out and directly in front of the posts, Shaun Wane decides that his team should go for the two-pointer. Matty Bowen converts to continue his 100% record with the boot on the night. Wiganners were now beginning to think "Bowen for the Harry Sunderland Trophy".

In the 64th minute Leeds played the ball 23 metres out from Wigan's goal-line. It was the last tackle so McGuire hoisted a kick high towards Dom Manfredi. Ryan Hall jumped and knocked it backward to Joel Moon who popped the ball over defender John Bateman to youngster Jimmy Keinhorst who delivers a pass to 20 year old Josh Walters to score what turns out to be the match levelling try 10 metres from the posts, he'll remember that for the rest of his life, Walters off with a hamstring injury. Kevin Sinfield then makes the crucial conversion, extending his record of most points in Super League Grand Finals, to put Leeds back in front with less than 16 minutes still left to play. In the end it proved decisive as Leeds went on to win by 22 points to 20. Peacock finishes his career as a player with a record of most tackles, most carries, most metres, most appearances & most wins in Grand Finals. The play was temporarily halted after 66 minutes when a male streaker ran onto the pitch and was promptly dealt with and ejected.

=== Post-match ===
Leeds' victory meant that they completed the treble of winning all of the major English domestic trophies - The Challenge Cup, League Leaders' Shield and the Super League Grand Final. They are the first team to achieve this feat since St Helens in their successful 2006 season.

It was the Leeds' trio who were given the farewell with a Grand Final victory.

Danny McGuire won the Harry Sunderland Trophy.

== World Club Series ==
By winning this match the Rhinos had qualified for the World Club Series Final, to be played on Sunday 21 February 2016 at Headingley Carnegie against the winners of the 2015 NRL Grand Final, the North Queensland Cowboys. Wigan, as the runners up, will play 2015 NRL Grand Final runners up Brisbane Broncos on Saturday 20 February 2016 at the DW Stadium. The third team to enter the World Club Series will see 2014 champions St. Helens take on Sydney Roosters at Langtree Park on Friday 19 February 2016.
