= Liam Farrell =

England international rugby league footballer

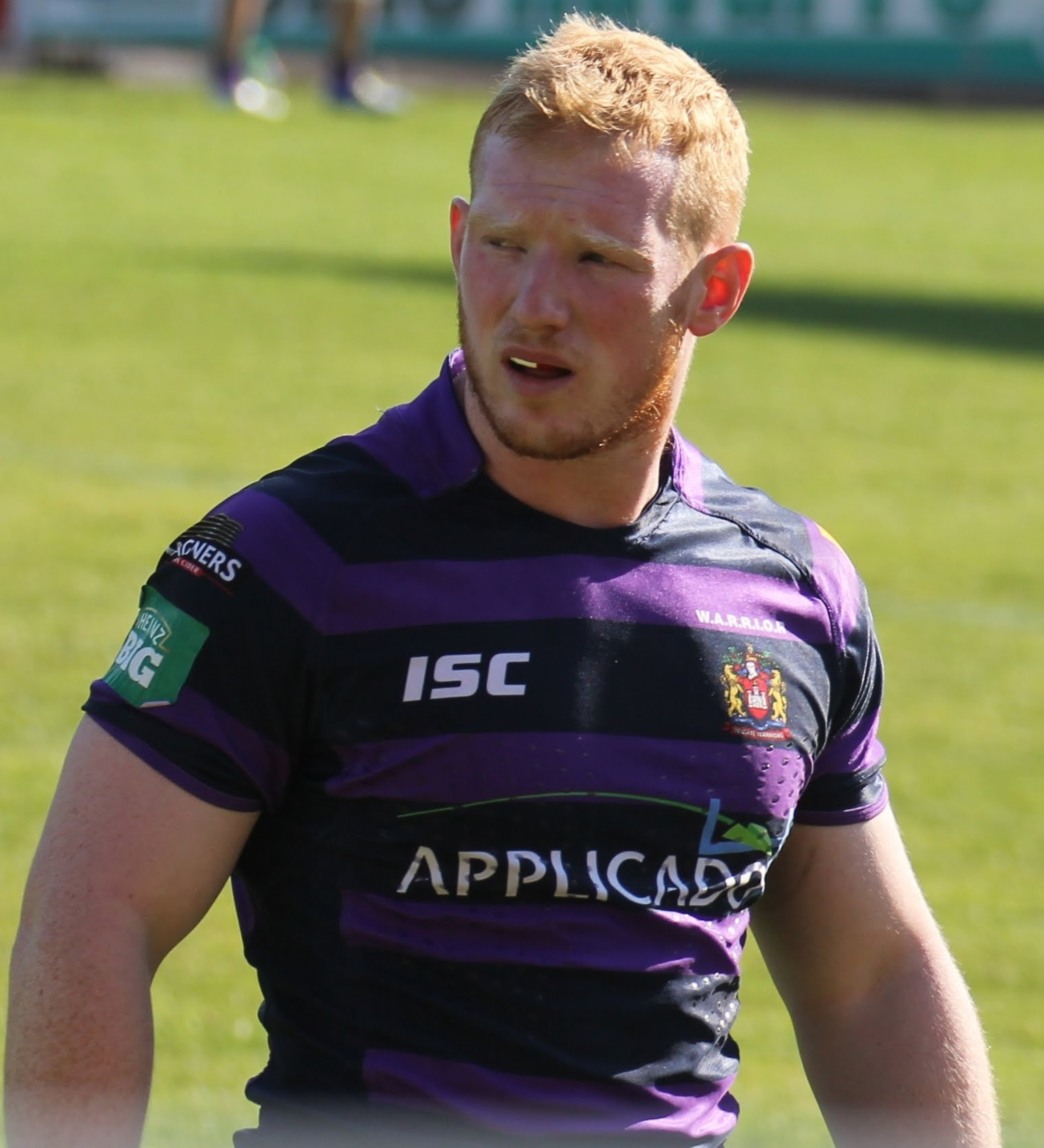

Personal information
- Full name: Liam Matthew Farrell
- Born: 2 July 1990 (age 36) Wigan, Greater Manchester, England

Playing information
- Height: 6 ft 0 in (1.83 m)
- Weight: 15 st 2 lb (96 kg)
- Position: Second-row
Club
Years	Team	Pld	T	G	FG	P
2010–26	Wigan Warriors	430	152	0	0	608
2010(loan)	→ Widnes Vikings	6	3	0	0	12
	Total	436	155	0	0	620
Representative
Years	Team	Pld	T	G	FG	P
2011–12	England Knights	2	0	0	0	0
2013–23	England	12	4	0	0	16
- Relatives: See: O'Loughlin Farrell family

Liam Matthew Farrell (born 2 July 1990) is an English former rugby league footballer who last played as a second-row forward for the Wigan Warriors in the Super League, and has played for England at international level.

He has spent time on loan from Wigan at the Widnes Vikings in the Championship.

== Background ==
Farrell was born in Wigan, Greater Manchester, England. His younger brother Connor Farrell played for Wigan. He is first cousin once removed to former Wigan captain Andy Farrell. He played junior rugby league at Wigan St Patricks before signing scholarship forms with Wigan Warriors.

== Career ==
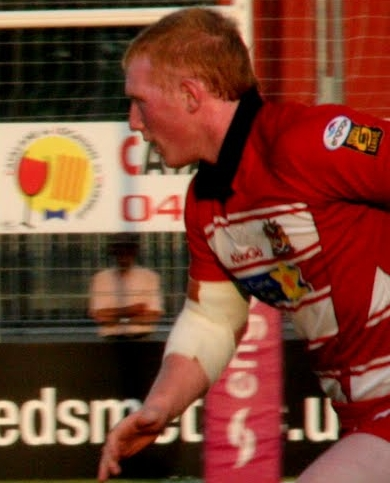
Farrell playing for Wigan in 2010

Farrell started the 2010 season on a dual registration loan at Widnes. He made a try scoring home début against Barrow. Wigan Head Coach Michael Maguire gave Farrell his Wigan first team début in the victory over Wakefield Trinity on 5 April, coming off the bench and scoring a try. He played in the 2010 Super League Grand Final victory over St Helens at Old Trafford.

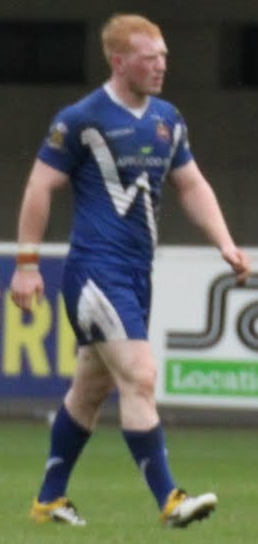
Farrell playing for Wigan in 2011

Farrell played from the substitutes' bench in the 2011 Challenge Cup Final victory over Leeds at Wembley Stadium.

Farrell played in the 2013 Challenge Cup Final victory over Hull F.C. at Wembley Stadium, and also played in the 2013 Super League Grand Final victory over Warrington at Old Trafford.

He played in the 2014 Super League Grand Final defeat by St. Helens at Old Trafford.

Farrell played in the 2015 Super League Grand Final defeat by Leeds at Old Trafford.

Farrell missed four months of the 2016 season due to a rib injury, but returned to play in the 2016 Super League Grand Final victory over the Warrington club at Old Trafford, and was awarded the Harry Sunderland Trophy for his man-of-the-match performance.

Farrell played in the 2017 Challenge Cup Final defeat by Hull F.C. at Wembley Stadium.

Farrell played in the 2018 Super League Grand Final victory over Warrington at Old Trafford.

He played in the 2019 World Club Challenge defeat against Sydney Roosters, but suffered a pectoral injury, which kept him out of action for four months.

Farrell played in the 2020 Super League Grand Final which Wigan lost 8–4 against St Helens.

On 28 May 2022, Farrell played for Wigan in their 2022 Challenge Cup Final win over Huddersfield. Two weeks later, he extended his contract with the club until the end of 2025. In December 2022, he was named the club's captain following the retirement of Thomas Leuluai.

In round 13 of the 2023 Super League season, Farrell scored a hat-trick in Wigan's 26-22 golden point extra-time victory over Hull Kingston Rovers. On 14 October 2023, Farrell played in Wigan's 2023 Super League Grand Final victory over the Catalans Dragons.

On 24 February 2024, Farrell played in Wigan's 2024 World Club Challenge final victory over Penrith. On 8 June 2024, Farrell played in Wigan's 2024 Challenge Cup final victory over Warrington. On 12 October 2024, Farrell played in Wigan's 9-2 2024 Super League grand final victory over Hull Kingston Rovers.

On 24 January 2025, Farrell renewed his contract until the end of the 2027 season. In July 2025, he made his 400th appearance for Wigan, becoming the 12th player in the club's history to do so. On 9 October 2025, Farrell played in Wigan's 6–24 loss in the 2025 Super League Grand Final against Hull Kingston Rovers.

On 30 May 2026, Farrell played in Wigan's 2026 Challenge Cup final victory against Hull Kingston Rovers.

In September, Farrell announced he would be retiring at the end of the 2026 season.

== International career ==
Farrell was selected in the England squad for the 2013 Rugby League World Cup, and made his debut in the team's final group game against Fiji.

Farrell played for England in the 2014 Four Nations. He featured in all of England's tournament games and also scored his first international try for England in the opening game against Samoa.

In October 2015, Farrell was selected in the England team for their test series against New Zealand. Before the series began England played a test match against France. Farrell scored a try in England's rout of their opponents.

In October 2016, Farrell was selected in the 24-man England squad for the 2016 Four Nations tournament.

He missed the 2021 Rugby League World Cup due to injury, but was recalled by England in 2023.

== Honours ==
=== Wigan Warriors ===
- Super League
  - Winner (6): 2010, 2013, 2016, 2018, 2023, 2024
- League Leaders' Shield
  - Winner (6): 2010, 2012, 2020, 2023, 2024, 2026
- Challenge Cup
  - Winner (5): 2011, 2013, 2022, 2024, 2026
- World Club Challenge
  - Winner (2): 2017, 2024

=== Individual ===
- Super League Dream Team
  - Selected (6): 2015, 2019, 2020, 2021, 2022, 2023
- Harry Sunderland Trophy
  - Winner (1): 2016
- Wigan Warriors Players' Player of the Year
  - Winner (1): 2021
