= 2013 Super League Grand Final =

Warrington Wolves	Wigan Warriors
16	30
	1	2	Total
WAR	16	0	16
WIG	6	24	30
- Date: 5 October 2013
- Stadium: Old Trafford
- Location: (England) Manchester
- Harry Sunderland Trophy: (Australia) Blake Green ( Wigan Warriors)
- Jerusalem: Laura Wright
- Referee: Richard Silverwood
- Attendance: 66,281

Broadcast partners
- Broadcasters: Sky Sports
- Commentators: Eddie Hemmings; Mike Stephenson; Brian Carney, Phil Clarke, Shaun McRae, Stuart Cummings

The 2013 Super League Grand Final was the 16th official grand final and conclusive and championship-deciding match of Super League XVIII. The game was held on Saturday 5 October 2013, at Old Trafford, Manchester, and was contested by Wigan Warriors and Warrington Wolves. The two teams reached the final after progressing through the Super League XVIII play-offs. It was Warrington's second successive Grand Final and second successive defeat as Wigan won 30-16 with 28 unanswered points after going 16-2 down in the first half to claim a Super League/Challenge Cup double, having won the 2013 Challenge Cup against Hull F.C. at Wembley Stadium in August.

== Background ==
Pos	Team	Pld	W	D	L	PF	PA	PD	Pts
2	Warrington Wolves	27	20	1	6	836	461	+375	41
4	Wigan Warriors	27	17	1	10	816	460	+356	35

=== Route to the Final ===
==== Warrington Wolves ====
Warrington's 2013 play-off campaign started with a 40-20 home win over last season's Grand Final winners, Leeds Rhinos with Ben Westwood scoring four tries. The result, coupled with Wigan's win over the league leaders Huddersfield, meant that Warrington would be the team to choose in the Club Call.

On Sunday 22 September, Warrington opted to play Huddersfield Giants in the Qualifying Semi Final instead of a re-match against Leeds. Warrington's coach Tony Smith did not have any say in the choice of opponent, after describing the Club Call as "a ridiculous gimmick". Warrington's choice proved fruitful, as they ran out 30-22 winners against Huddersfield to send Warrington into their second Grand Final in two years, having never reached the final before the 2012 final.

Warrington
Round	Opposition	Score
Qualifying Play-Off	Leeds Rhinos (H)	40-20
Semi-Final	Huddersfield Giants (H)	30-22
Key: (H) = Home venue; (A) = Away venue.

==== Wigan Warriors ====
Following a poor run of results towards the end of the regular season, Wigan slipped down from first to fourth in the table, forfeiting home advantage in the first round of the play-offs as a result. Despite being drawn away in their Qualifying Play off game, Wigan went to Huddersfield's John Smith's Stadium and won 22-8 with two tries for Josh Charnley and two drop-goals from Matty Smith.

Following the Club Call decision by Warrington, Wigan met Leeds in the Qualifying Semi Final at the DW Stadium at the same stage and same venue as the 2012 play-offs. However, Wigan would be successful in 2013, winning 22-12 in what would be the last home match for Sam Tomkins, Pat Richards and Lee Mossop.

Wigan
Round	Opposition	Score
Preliminary Semi-Final	Huddersfield Giants (H)	22-8
Semi-Final	Leeds Rhinos (H)	22-12
Key: (H) = Home venue; (A) = Away venue.

== Match details ==
5 October 2013
18:00 BST

Warrington Wolves	16–30	Wigan Warriors
Tries: J. Monaghan 21'; Grix 24'; Westwood 26'; Goals: Ratchford 24', 26'	(Report)	Tries: Goulding 38'; McIlorum 49'; Charnley 53'; Green 65'; Richards 74'; Goals: Richards 11', 49', 53', 65', 74'

Old Trafford, Manchester
Attendance: 66,281
Referee: Richard Silverwood
Player of the Match: Blake Green

Warrington Wolves		Position	Wigan Warriors	
19	(England) Stefan Ratchford	Fullback	1	(England) Sam Tomkins
2	(England) Chris Riley	Wing	2	(England) Josh Charnley
3	(England) Chris Bridge	Centre	3	(England) Darrell Goulding
4	(England) Ryan Atkins	Centre	17	(England) Iain Thornley
5	(Australia) Joel Monaghan	Wing	5	(Ireland) Pat Richards
6	(Wales) Lee Briers	Stand-off	6	(Australia) Blake Green
7	(England) Richie Myler	Scrum-half	7	(England) Matty Smith
16	(England) Paul Wood	Prop	20	(Wales) Gil Dudson
14	(England) Mickey Higham	Hooker	9	(Ireland) Michael McIlorum
18	(England) Chris Hill	Prop	10	(England) Lee Mossop
12	(England) Ben Westwood	Second-row	11	(Samoa) Harrison Hansen
15	(Ireland) Simon Grix	Second-row	12	(England) Liam Farrell
13	(England) Ben Harrison	loose forward	13	(England) Sean O'Loughlin (c)
8	(England) Adrian Morley (c)	Interchange	4	(England) Jack Hughes
9	(Australia) Michael Monaghan	Interchange	15	(Wales) Ben Flower
10	(England) Garreth Carvell	Interchange	21	(England) Scott Taylor
17	(England) Michael Cooper	Interchange	26	(England) Dom Crosby
	(Australia) Tony Smith	Coach		(England) Shaun Wane

=== First half ===
A cagey opening to the game saw little in the way of notable action aside from 3 minutes into the game when Wigan stand off Blake Green was tackled and Warrington second rower Ben Westwood punched a prone Green in the face. The referee only put Westwood on report for the incident. After receiving treatment, Green was able to carry on. Wigan took the lead on 11 minutes when Pat Richards booted a penalty kick to put Wigan 2-0 up. Green kicked a 40/20 shortly after to give Wigan a prime opportunity to extend their lead but they couldn't take it. On 21 minutes, Warrington took the lead when winger Joel Monaghan plucked a Lee Briers kick out of the air but Stefan Ratchford couldn't nail the conversion, 4-2 to Warrington.

3 minutes later the Wire extended their lead after the Warriors kicked out on the full from the kickoff. They gained territory from the set and Simon Grix took Micky Higham's pass to crash over the line. Ratchford converts to make it 10-2. Warrington scored again on 26 minutes as Ben Westwood charged over from close range after great work from Briers with Ratchford kicking the extras to make it 16-2 and put Warrington in the driving seat. As the game inched closer to half time, a turning point came when Joel Monaghan paid the ultimate price for halting Warriors winger Pat Richards' charge to the corner as he knocked himself out preventing Richards from going over for a try. After he was stretchered off, Wigan showed there were still signs of life when the Josh Charnley-Darrell Goulding combination that had been so great all season, but so wasteful in this game up until this point, finally clicked when Sam Tomkins sent Goulding over in the corner. Richards was unable to convert as the score at half time was 16-6.

=== Second half ===
The next try was going to be a pivotal one whichever way it went and it went to Wigan on 49 minutes as Michael McIlorum threw a dummy at the play the ball which fooled Warrington's defence and he was able to scoot over the line with Richards' conversion reducing the deficit to 16-12. Warrington would then lose Ratchford to injury as they began to run out of bodies. Wigan tied the game on 53 minutes as Goulding played a grubber kick behind the Warrington line and Charnley was quickest to react as he won the race to the ball and went over; Richards kicking the extras to give Wigan a slender 18-16 lead. The Warriors then extended their lead with 15 minutes left as Green, sporting a black eye after the punch he took earlier in the game, sold Adrian Morley a dummy before diving under the posts to give Richards an easy conversion to put Wigan 24-16 up. With six minutes left, Richards ended a glittering 8 season career at Wigan with one more try and conversion as he plucked a looping pass from Sean O'Loughlin to touch down in the corner and convert his own try to make it 30-16. This win sealed the Super League and Challenge Cup double for Wigan, the Warriors becoming the first team to achieve that feat since St Helens in 2006 and ensured that Sam Tomkins, Pat Richards, and Lee Mossop would all leave for the NRL on a high. It was heartbreak though for Lee Briers, who retired at the end of this season, and outgoing Wolves players Adrian Morley, Gareth Carvell, and Michael Cooper.

== World Club Challenge ==
By winning this match the Warriors had qualified for the World Club Challenge, to be played early in the 2014 season against the winners of the 2013 NRL Grand final, the Sydney Roosters.
