= Sam Powell =

English rugby league footballer (born 1992)

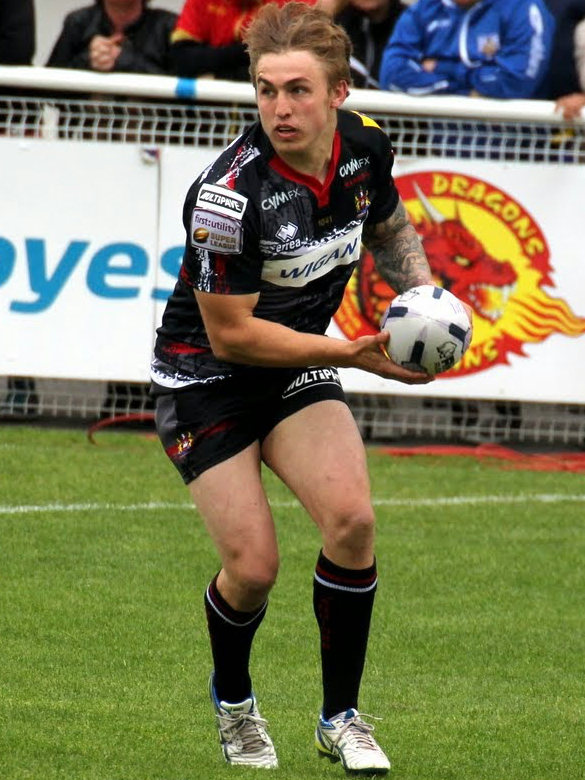

Personal information
- Full name: Samuel Powell
- Born: 3 July 1992 (age 34) Wigan, Greater Manchester, England

Playing information
- Height: 5 ft 10 in (1.78 m)
- Weight: 13 st 3 lb (84 kg)
- Position: Hooker, Scrum-half, Stand-off
Club
Years	Team	Pld	T	G	FG	P
2012–23	Wigan Warriors	273	42	12	4	186
2013(DR)	→ South Wales Scorpions	6	2	0	0	8
2014(DR)	→ Workington Town	1	0	0	0	0
2015(DR)	→ Workington Town	1	2	0	0	8
2024–26	Warrington Wolves	76	7	0	0	28
	Total	357	53	12	4	230
Representative
Years	Team	Pld	T	G	FG	P
2018–	England Knights	3	0	0	0	0

Sam Powell (born 3 July 1992) is an English former rugby league footballer who last played as a scrum-half or hooker for the Warrington Wolves in the Super League and the England Knights at international level.

He has spent time on dual-registration from Wigan with Workington Town in the Championship and with the South Wales Scorpions in League 1. After signing for Wigan as a youngster his first team début came in a 2012 Super League game against Hull FC.

== Background ==
Powell was born in Wigan, Greater Manchester, England.

== Club career ==
=== Wigan Warriors ===
Powell signed for the Wigan academy aged 16 and progressed through the ranks winning the Academy Grand Final against Warrington in 2011.

==== 2012 ====
Powell got his debut for Wigan against Hull F.C. during August, scoring a try in the 48–10 victory. He started at scrum-half after Brett Finch suffered a hamstring injury.

==== 2013 ====
Powell made 16 appearances scoring tries against Hull KR, London Broncos and Huddersfield Giants. His kicking game was one of the reasons for his run in the team, a long range drop goal winning the game against Widnes Vikings in early June. Powell was then called up to the England Knights squad alongside fellow Warriors Dominic Crosby, Iain Thornley and Scott Taylor. He made his debut for the side against Samoa scoring two tries in the 52–16 victory.

==== 2014 ====
Powell was handed the number 19 shirt for the new season and made 22 appearances scoring against Bradford Bulls, Salford Red Devils and Hull FC. Halfway through the season coach Shaun Wane decided to experiment with the halfback pairing, moving George Williams from hooker to stand off, with Powell starting at dummy half. This would become a permanent switch after Williams impressed in the halves.

He was part of the team that lost the 2014 Super League Grand Final to St. Helens at Old Trafford in a game famous for a Ben Flower red card.

==== 2015 ====
The new Super League season play 23 times for the Wigan club with more appearances coming from the bench showing a positional change from halfback to hooker. His only try of the season came against Hull F.C. in late July.

He made his second appearance at Old Trafford losing out to the Leeds Rhinos in a tense 2015 Super League Grand Final.

==== 2016 ====
Powell was handed the number 16 shirt for the new season, an early indication that he would be playing mainly from the bench replacing Michael McIlorum at hooker. This however was not to be the case after McIlorum suffered a fractured and dislocated ankle against the Brisbane Broncos in just the third game of the season. Despite initial speculation that Wigan would have to bring in a replacement Powell made the role his own playing 36 times playing on many occasions 80 minutes per game. Tries again St. Helens, Castleford Tigers, Wakefield Trinity and Hull F.C. ensured it was his most successful season in both appearances and scores.

He won the Super League Grand Final on the third time of asking in a tense affair which saw the Wigan Warriors beat the Warrington Wolves 12–6 at Old Trafford.

==== 2017 ====
With McIlorum still out injured, Powell started the season at hooker and played his 100th game for the Wigan club in the 22-6 World Club Challenge victory over the Cronulla-Sutherland Sharks. McIlorum returned in the Good Friday derby against St. Helens but Powell kept his place in the team making 31 appearances in all competitions scoring twice and kicking 6 goals.

He played in the 2017 Challenge Cup Final defeat by Hull F.C. at Wembley Stadium.

==== 2018 ====
The departure of McIlorum meant that Thomas Leuluai was handed the number 9 shirt with Powell moving to the number 7.

He played in the 2018 Super League Grand Final victory over the Warrington Wolves at Old Trafford.

==== 2019 ====
Powell played 25 games for Wigan in 2019 as they suffered a shock semi-final loss against Salford.

==== 2020 ====
Powell played in the 2020 Super League Grand Final which Wigan lost 8–4 against St Helens.

==== 2021, 2022 & 2023 ====
Powell played 23 matches for Wigan in the 2021 Super League season as the club reached the playoffs but were eliminated by Leeds. The following season, Powell played in Wigan's upset semi-final loss against Leeds scoring the only try of the match. On 14 October 2023, Powell played in Wigan's 2023 Super League Grand Final victory over the Catalans Dragons. On 10 November 2023 it was reported that he had signed for Warrington in the Super League on a two-year deal.

=== 2024 ===
On 8 June, Powell played in Warrington's 2024 Challenge Cup final defeat against Wigan.

=== 2025 ===
On 7 June, Powell played in Warrington's 8-6 Challenge Cup final loss against Hull Kingston Rovers.

2026

On 3 October, Powell played in Warrington's 23-10 Super League Grand Final loss to Wakefield Trinity.

== International career ==
In July 2018 he was selected in the England Knights Performance squad. Later that year he was selected for the England Knights on their tour of Papua New Guinea. He played against Papua New Guinea at the Lae Football Stadium and the Oil Search National Football Stadium.

In 2019 he was selected for the England Knights against Jamaica at Headingley Rugby Stadium.

== Career statistics ==
Club	Season	Apps	Tries	Goals	F/G	Points
2012	Wigan Warriors	1	1	-	-	4
2013	Wigan Warriors	16	3	-	2	14
2013	South Wales Scorpions	6	2	0	0	8
2014	Wigan Warriors	22	3	-	-	12
2014	Workington Town	1	0	0	0	0
2015	Wigan Warriors	23	1	0	0	4
2015	Workington Town	1	2	0	0	8
2016	Wigan Warriors	36	7	1	0	30
2017	Wigan Warriors	31	2	6	0	20
2018	Wigan Warriors	33	2	4	0	16
2019	Wigan Warriors	27	3	0	2	14
2020	Wigan Warriors	18	12	0	0	48
2021	Wigan Warriors	23	3	0	0	12
2022	Wigan Warriors	21	3	0	0	12
2023	Wigan Warriors	23	2	0	0	8
2024	Warrington Wolves	32	3	0	0	12
2025	Warrington Wolves	29	1	0	0	4
2026	Warrington Wolves	17	3	0	0	12
Total		357	53	12	4	230
