= Matty Smith (rugby league) =

England international rugby league footballer

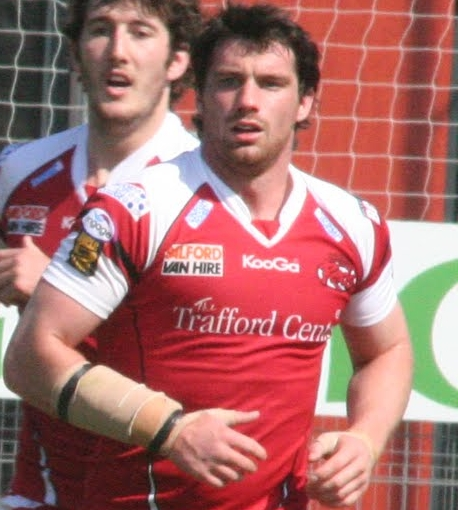

Personal information
- Full name: Mathew Joe Smith
- Born: 23 July 1987 (age 39) St Helens, Merseyside, England

Playing information
- Height: 5 ft 9 in (1.76 m)
- Weight: 13 st 5 lb (85 kg)
- Position: Scrum-half, Hooker, Stand-off
Club
Years	Team	Pld	T	G	FG	P
2006–10	St Helens	20	3	10	1	33
2008(loan)	→ Widnes Vikings	10	3	0	0	12
2009(loan)	→ Celtic Crusaders	16	3	2	1	17
2010(loan)	→ Salford City Reds	26	8	4	1	41
2011–12	Salford City Reds	50	6	3	0	30
2012–16	Wigan Warriors	139	22	304	25	721
2017–18	St Helens	29	2	0	3	11
2018(DR)	→ Sheffield Eagles	1	0	0	0	0
2019	Catalans Dragons	16	0	0	1	1
2019(loan)	→ Warrington Wolves	6	0	0	0	0
2020–21	Widnes Vikings	57	1	0	3	7
	Total	370	48	323	35	873
Representative
Years	Team	Pld	T	G	FG	P
2011–12	England Knights	2	1	5	0	14
2014–15	England	4	0	0	0	0

Coaching information
Club
Years	Team	Gms	W	D	L	W%
2023–24	St Helens R.F.C. Women	29	23	0	6	79
2025	Wigan Warriors Academy
	Total	29	23	0	6	79

Mathew Joe Smith (born 23 July 1987) is an English rugby league coach and former player, who will be the head coach of Wigan Warriors' academy from 2025. He began coaching in 2023 for St Helens in a dual role as women's head coach and men's assistant coach.

As a player he played as a scrum-half for St Helens, Salford Red Devils, Wigan Warriors, and Catalans Dragons in the Super League and Widnes Vikings in the RFL Championship, in addition to various loans. Internationally, he represented England and England Knights.

== Background ==
Smith was born in St Helens, Merseyside, England.

Before converting to rugby league, Smith had a youth career with Premier League association football club Everton, occasionally appearing in the reserve team.

== Club career ==
=== St Helens (2006–2010) ===
After coming through the junior ranks at St Helens, Smith made his Super League début for the club in 2006 in a match against Huddersfield Giants.

After a loan spell in the Championship with Widnes in 2008, Smith joined Celtic Crusaders on a season-long loan and played for the Welsh franchise in their first season in Super League. He later had a loan spell at Salford, for whom he eventually signed on a permanent basis.

After his Salford loan, Smith was recalled by his parent club St. Helens to play in the 2010 Super League Grand Final against Wigan, which St Helens lost despite a valiant performance by Smith.

=== Salford (2010–2012) ===
Following his successful loan spell at the club, Smith signed for Salford after the 2010 season and spent all of 2011 and the first half of 2012 with the club, before moving to the Wigan Warriors.

=== Wigan (2012–2016) ===
Two days after making his England début against The Exiles, Smith completed his switch to Wigan on 6 July 2012, after a successful negotiation between the clubs to the early release from his Salford contract. He made his début on 3 August 2012 against Hull FC, with Wigan winning the match 48–10.

In 2013, Matty received the number 7 jersey formerly worn by the likes of Thomas Leuluai, Adrian Lam, Shaun Edwards and Andy Gregory. Smith won the Lance Todd Trophy as man of the match in the 2013 Challenge Cup Final as Wigan defeated Hull F.C. 16–0 at Wembley Stadium.

He was also part of the Wigan team that beat the Warrington Wolves 30–16 in the Super League Grand Final as Wigan won both the Super League and Challenge Cup.

He ended the year with selection in the Super League Dream Team.

After goalkicker Pat Richards returned to the NRL at the end of the 2013 season, Matty Smith was given the goalkicking duties for Wigan. Smith also kicked 6 drop goals in the 2014 regular season for Wigan as well as earning a spot in the 2014 Super League Dream Team. On Friday 19 September, a night after Smith scored 21 points in the 57–4 playoff rout against the Huddersfield Giants, he signed a new four-year contract with the Warriors.

He played in the 2014 Super League Grand Final defeat by St. Helens at Old Trafford.

He played in the 2015 Super League Grand Final defeat by the Leeds Rhinos at Old Trafford.

He played in the 2016 Super League Grand Final victory over the Warrington Wolves at Old Trafford.

Smith signed a new 2-year deal, On 11 October it was announced Matty had signed a 4-year deal with former club St. Helens for the beginning of the 2017 season.

=== St Helens (2017-2018) ===
On 23 June 2017, Smith kicked a long range field goal in the final second of the match against Salford to secure Saints a 25-24 victory. St Helens had been down by three converted tries in the latter stages of the game before staging the comeback.

In 2018, he made seven appearances for St Helens as they won the League Leaders Shield but fell short of a grand final appearance losing to Warrington.

=== Catalans Dragons (2019) ===
In 2019, he joined Catalans Dragons. On 5 December 2019, he was released by the club after making 16 appearances. He also had a loan spell with Warrington in 2019.

== International career ==
After a stellar 2014 season Smith was selected in England's 24-man squad for the 2014 Four Nations held in Australia and New Zealand. Smith played in all 3 of England's matches. In 2015 Smith was selected in England's 24-man team for the end-of-year internationals but did not feature in the test against France or in the first two tests of the three-match test-series against New Zealand. He was a late call-up in the final test-match at the Wigan Warriors's home ground, DW Stadium, in place of Wigan teammate George Williams. He was influential in the final game delivering a man-of-the-match performance.

== Coaching career ==
As head coach of St Helens women, he led the team to two Challenge Cups and one League Leaders Shield.

== Personal life ==
In 2015, Smith set up a business with former Salford team mate Stefan Ratchford called Future Stars, which runs coaching sessions for junior rugby league players.
