= Jack Murphy (rugby league) =

English rugby league footballer

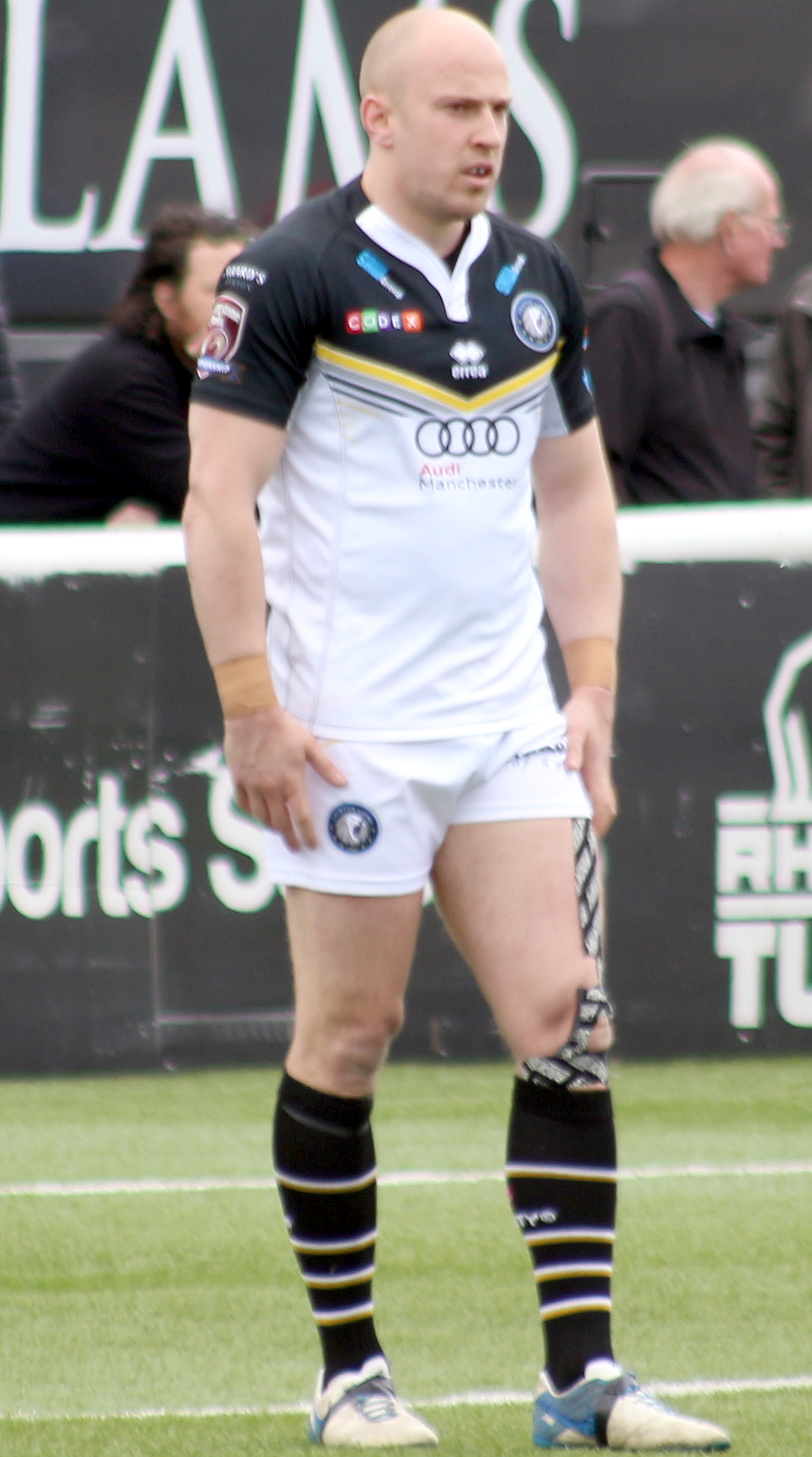

Personal information
- Born: 18 March 1992 (age 34) Warrington, England

Playing information
- Position: Fullback
Club
| Years | Team | Pld | T | G | FG | P |
|---|---|---|---|---|---|---|
| 2012–14 | Wigan Warriors | 3 | 1 | 0 | 0 | 4 |
| 2012(DR) | → South Wales Scorpions | 1 | 0 | 0 | 0 | 0 |
| 2013(loan) | → Salford Red Devils | 10 | 3 | 1 | 0 | 14 |
| 2013(DR) | → South Wales Scorpions | 12 | 5 | 30 | 0 | 80 |
| 2014(DR) | → Workington Town | 24 | 3 | 0 | 1 | 13 |
| 2015–16 | Workington Town | 43 | 10 | 3 | 0 | 46 |
| 2017– | Swinton Lions | 12 | 5 | 0 | 0 | 20 |
| | Total | 105 | 27 | 34 | 1 | 177 |
- Source: As of 30 April 2017

Jack Murphy is an English rugby league footballer who plays as a fullback for the Swinton Lions.

He started his career with Wigan, making his Super League début against Bradford Bulls in 2012, during which he also scored his first Super League try. For the 2013 season he joined Salford on loan where, ironically, his first appearance was against Wigan. He spent the 2014 season on dual-registration with Workington Town, and signed a permanent deal with the club in October 2014.
