= Larne Patrick =

Wales international rugby league footballer

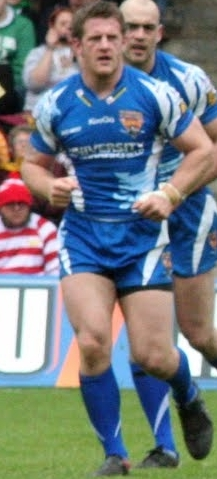

Personal information
- Full name: Larne Michael Patrick
- Born: 3 November 1988 (age 36); Blackpool, Lancashire, England

Playing information
- Height: 6 ft 0 in (1.83 m)
- Weight: 16 st 5 lb (104 kg)
- Position: Prop, Second-row, Loose forward
Club
Years	Team	Pld	T	G	FG	P
2009–16	Huddersfield Giants	149	32	0	0	128
2015(loan)	→ Wigan Warriors	29	4	0	0	16
2016(loan)	→ Castleford Tigers	4	0	0	0	0
2016–17	Castleford Tigers	20	1	0	0	4
2018	Leigh Centurions	6	1	0	0	4
2018(loan)	→ Workington Town	3	0	0	0	0
	Total	211	38	0	0	152
Representative
Years	Team	Pld	T	G	FG	P
2013	Wales	3	0	0	0	0

Larne Patrick (born 3 November 1988) is a former Wales international rugby league footballer who last played as a prop and second-row for the Leigh Centurions in the Championship.

Previously playing for the Castleford Tigers, Huddersfield Giants and the Wigan Warriors.

== Background ==
Patrick was born in Blackpool, Lancashire, England. He is of Welsh heritage.

== Career ==
Patrick joined Huddersfield from Manly based reserve-grade side Narrabeen Sharks in Australia after being on the academy books at Bradford Bulls. As a youth he won international honours with the England Academy. He made his first team début against Castleford in round 5 of 2009's Super League XIV.

Of Welsh heritage, Patrick committed to Wales at international level and made his international début in the opening match of the 2013 Rugby League World Cup.

In November 2014, Patrick joined Wigan Warriors on a season-long loan in an exchange deal for Jack Hughes.

He played in the 2015 Super League Grand Final defeat by the Leeds Rhinos at Old Trafford.

In April 2016, Patrick joined Castleford Tigers on loan for the remainder of the season. This was later converted into a permanent deal when he signed a three-year contract in June 2016. However, the contract was ended early when Patrick signed a two-year deal with Leigh in October 2017.
