= Jack Hughes (rugby league) =

Great Britain international rugby league footballer

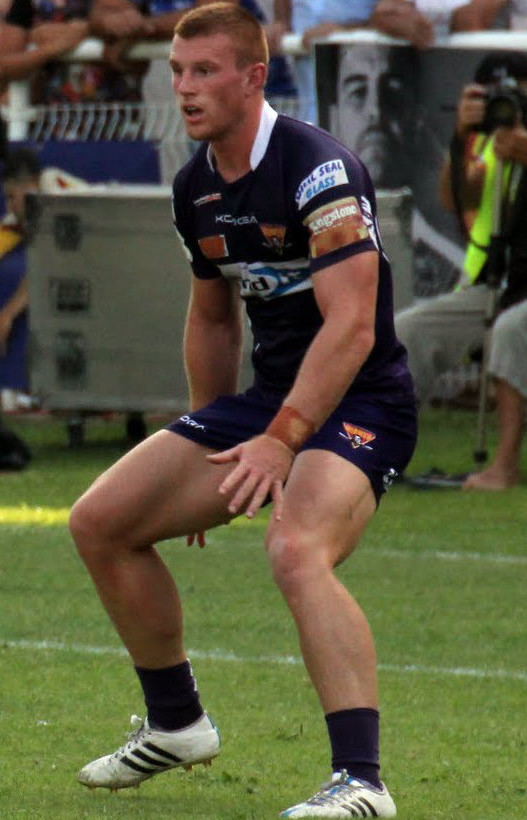

Personal information
- Full name: Jack Hughes
- Born: 4 January 1992 (age 34) Billinge Higher End, Wigan, England

Playing information
- Height: 6 ft 1 in (1.85 m)
- Weight: 15 st 10 lb (100 kg)
- Position: Second-row, Centre, Loose forward
Club
Years	Team	Pld	T	G	FG	P
2011–15	Wigan Warriors	75	9	0	0	36
2011(loan)	→ Barrow Raiders	8	3	0	0	12
2013(loan)	→ Leigh Centurions	1	0	0	0	0
2014(loan)	→ Workington Town	1	0	0	0	0
2015(loan)	→ Huddersfield Giants	32	5	0	0	20
2016–22	Warrington Wolves	167	26	0	0	104
2023–26	Leigh Leopards	48	2	0	0	8
	Total	332	45	0	0	180
Representative
Years	Team	Pld	T	G	FG	P
2012–18	England Knights	3	0	0	0	0
2019	Great Britain	2	0	0	0	0

Jack Hughes (born 4 January 1992) is an English former rugby league footballer who last played as a second-row and centre for the Leigh Leopards in the Super League and the England Knights at international level.

Hughes played for the Wigan Warriors in the Super League, and on loan from Wigan at the Barrow Raiders, Leigh Centurions and Workington Town in the Championship, and the Huddersfield Giants in the top flight. He also played for the Warrington Wolves in the Super League.

== Early life ==
Hughes was born on 4 January 1992 in Billinge Higher End, Wigan, Greater Manchester, England. He attended Golborne High School for his secondary education.

Before joining Wigan officially in 2008, Hughes played for Golborne Parkside, right up until u16s age level, and then amateur Wigan St Judes feeder club.

== Club career ==
Hughes made his first-grade début for Wigan in a fourth round Challenge Cup win over Barrow on 8 May 2011. He has also appeared representatively in an academy squad for the English national team in 2010 to face the Australian Schoolboys rugby league team during their tour of England.

Hughes' first experience of professional rugby league came in 2011, when he was sent to Barrow on a dual-registration deal. Although not announced during the pre-season in Wigan's 2011 squad, he made his début first-grade appearance in the fourth round of the 2011 Challenge Cup, ironically a victory against Barrow, playing off the bench as a substitute for Wigan.

Hughes broke into the first team at Wigan at the start of the 2012 season, and was soon rewarded with a new long-term contract with the club.

In 2013, he played one game at Leigh Centurions on dual registration. He played in the 2013 Super League Grand Final victory over the Warrington Wolves at Old Trafford.

In November 2014, Hughes joined Huddersfield Giants on a season-long loan in an exchange deal for Larne Patrick.

In August 2015, Hughes signed a contract to play for the Warrington Wolves for the next two seasons starting in 2016.

He played in the 2016 Challenge Cup Final defeat by Hull F.C. at Wembley Stadium.

Hughes played in the 2016 Super League Grand Final defeat by Wigan at Old Trafford. Hughes played in the 2018 Challenge Cup Final defeat by the Catalans Dragons at Wembley Stadium.

Hughes played in the 2018 Super League Grand Final defeat by the Wigan side at Old Trafford. In August 2019, Hughes ruptured a testicle in a match. Hughes played in the 2019 Challenge Cup Final victory over St. Helens at Wembley Stadium. On 12 August 2023, Hughes played for Leigh in their 2023 Challenge Cup final victory over Hull Kingston Rovers. Hughes played 15 games for Leigh in the 2023 Super League season as the club finished fifth on the table and qualified for the playoffs. He played in their elimination playoff loss against Hull Kington Rovers. Hughes played 29 games for Leigh in the 2024 Super League season which saw the club finish fifth on the table.

On 10 September 2026 he announced his retirement as a professional

== International career ==
The academy squad of the English national team selected Hughes to face a touring Australian Schoolboys rugby league team in 2010, and he played in a victory against the Australian team in the opening fixture as a second-row.

He played for the England Knights team in their 2012 European Cup campaign.

In July 2018 he was selected in the England Knights Performance squad. Later that year he was selected for the England Knights on their tour of Papua New Guinea. He played against Papua New Guinea at the Lae Football Stadium and the Oil Search National Football Stadium.

He was selected in England 9s squad for the 2019 Rugby League World Cup 9s, but withdrew due to injury and was replaced by Blake Austin.

He was selected in squad for the 2019 Great Britain Lions tour of the Southern Hemisphere.
