= Oliver Gildart =

Great Britain and England international rugby league footballer

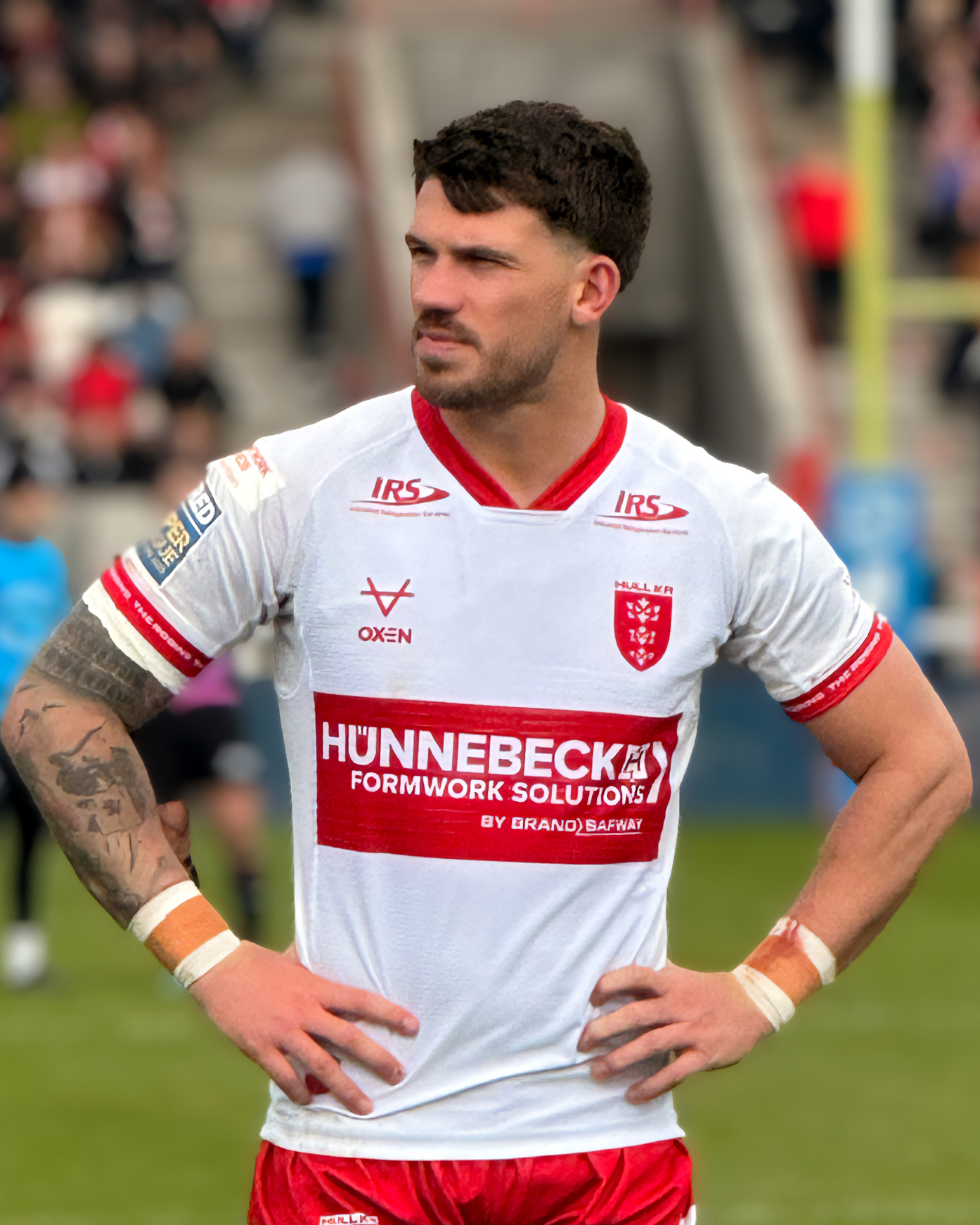

Personal information
- Full name: Oliver Patrick Gildart
- Born: 6 August 1996 (age 30) Hindley, Greater Manchester, England
- Height: 5 ft 11 in (1.81 m)
- Weight: 13 st 8 lb (86 kg)

Playing information
- Position: Centre
Club
Years	Team	Pld	T	G	FG	P
2015–21	Wigan Warriors	143	65	0	0	260
2015(loan)	→ Workington Town	2	0	0	0	0
2015(loan)	→ Salford Red Devils	3	1	0	0	4
2022	Wests Tigers	8	1	0	0	4
2022(loan)	→ Sydney Roosters	2	0	0	0	0
2023	Leigh Leopards	8	1	0	0	4
2024–	Hull Kingston Rovers	59	20	0	0	76
	Total	225	88	0	0	348
Representative
Years	Team	Pld	T	G	FG	P
2018	England	3	1	0	0	4
2019	Great Britain	1	0	0	0	0
- Source: As of 19 September 2026
- Parents: Ian Gildart (father); Claire Gildart (mother)

Oliver Patrick Gildart (born 6 August 1996) is an English professional rugby league footballer who plays as a centre for Hull Kingston Rovers in the Super League.

He has previously played for the Wests Tigers and Sydney Roosters in the Australian NRL, the Wigan Warriors in the Super League, and spent time on loan from Wigan at Workington Town in the Kingstone Press Championship and the Salford Red Devils in the Super League. Gildart has also played for England and Great Britain at international level.

Gildart won the 2017 Super League Young Player Of The Year, and the 2016 and the 2018 Super League Grand Finals with Wigan.

== Early life ==
Gildart was born in Hindley, Greater Manchester, England to Claire and Ian, a former professional rugby league footballer for Wigan, Wakefield, and Oldham. He is of Italian descent through his mother, and is eligible to represent the Italian national team.

== Club career ==
=== 2015-2016 ===
A product of Wigan's junior system, Gildart made his Super League début on loan for Salford Red Devils in 2015, making a total of three appearances before returning to his parent club. He made his début for Wigan in the Super 8s match against Warrington Wolves on 21 August 2015, scoring a try. He then kept his place in the Wigan team for the remainder of the 2015 season, including an appearance in the 2015 Super League Grand Final at Old Trafford in only his tenth career match.

Gildart continued to show promise throughout the 2016 season. One of the signature tries of the year was scored by him in an away match in Perpignan as he straightened up the line and seared his way to the try-line after a flowing length-of-the-field attack by Wigan. He became a fixture in the centres for Wigan. Gildart scored a try in the 2016 Super League Grand Final against the Warrington Wolves which brought Wigan level at 6–6 before they went on to win 12–6 at Old Trafford.

=== 2017 ===
Gildart was in the Wigan team that defeated NRL champions, the Cronulla-Sutherland Sharks 22–6 to win the World Club Challenge, which ensured Oliver would join father Ian (who was an interchange in the 1987 and 1991 wins) as a World Club Challenge medal winner. Oliver also scored a try in that game. After starting the season in great form, he broke three vertebrae in his back following a Brett Ferres 'crusher' tackle. Gildart was ruled out for three months. He returned with a try against the Leigh Centurions on 8 June. Gildart scored a few weeks later against the Warrington Wolves followed by a brace (two tries) against Leeds. In the Challenge Cup semi-final against Salford, he scored another brace and went on to score another try in the 2017 Challenge Cup Final defeat by Hull F.C. at Wembley Stadium.

Against traditional rivals St. Helens he scored the opening try followed by a slick move within the first two minutes. Just a few moments later following a Ben Barba mistake, Gildart raced forty yards to complete his brace.

=== 2018-2021 ===
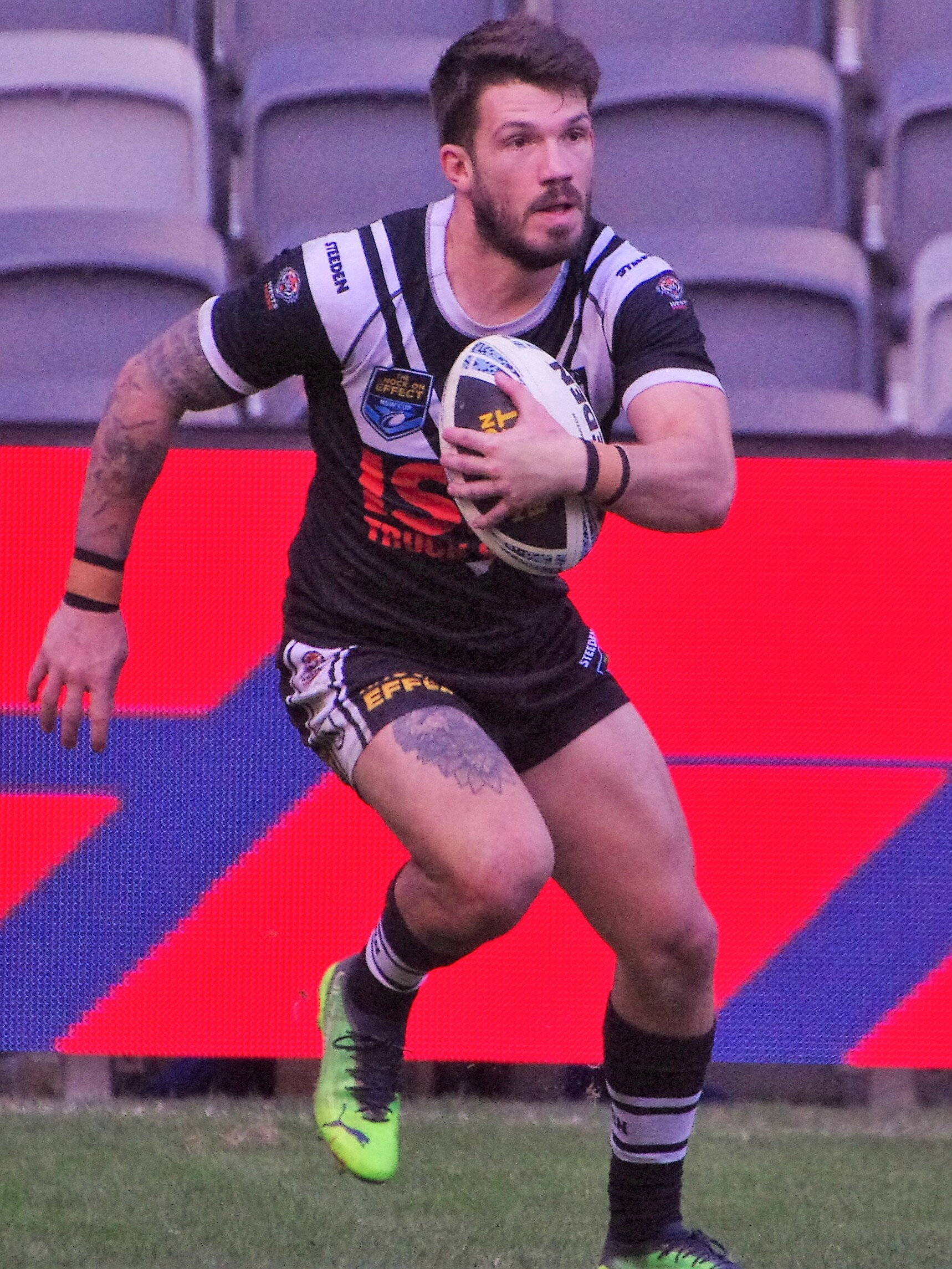
Gildart playing for the Wests Tigers in 2022

Gildart played in the 2018 Super League Grand Final victory over the Warrington Wolves at Old Trafford. In 2019, he played thirty-two games for Wigan, including their shock semi-final loss against Salford. Gildart also played in the 2020 Super League Grand Final which Wigan lost 8–4 against St Helens. On 31 May, Gildart signed a two-year deal to join NRL side, the Wests Tigers. In round 10 of the 2021 Super League season, Gildart scored two tries for Wigan in a 18–8 defeat against Hull Kingston Rovers.

=== 2022 ===
In round 1 of the 2022 NRL season, Gildart made his club debut for the Wests Tigers in their 26–16 loss against Melbourne. In round 9, he scored his first try in the NRL during a 36–22 loss against Manly at Brookvale Oval. On 31 July, Gildart joined the Sydney Roosters on a loan deal which would go to the end of the 2022 NRL season. He scored five tries on his debut for North Sydney in their 60-4 NSW Cup win over Newcastle.

=== 2023 ===
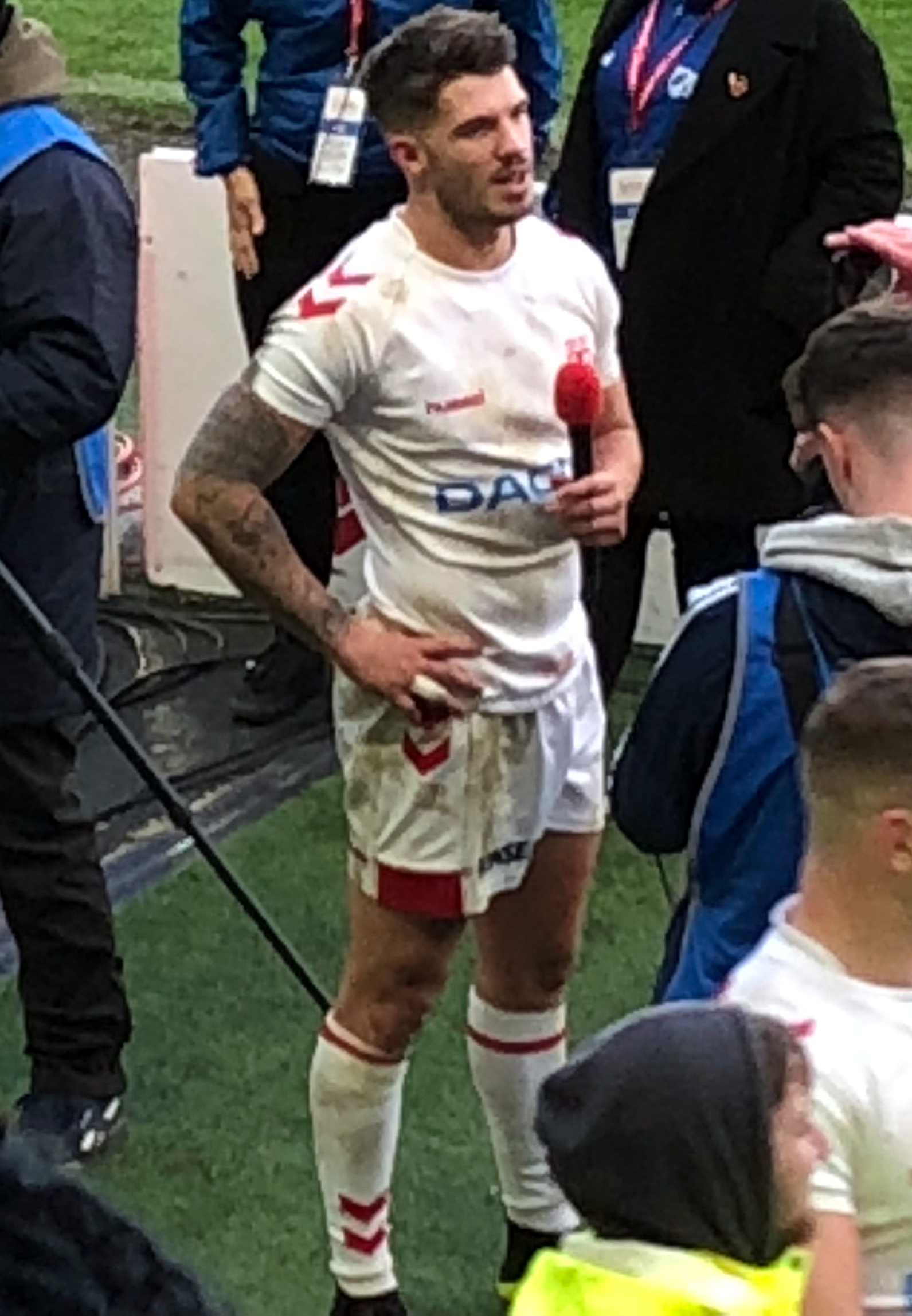
Gildart post-match for England in 2018

In October 2022, Gildart was released early from his contract with a year left from the West Tigers. A one-year contract with the Dolphins for 2023 was subsequently confirmed. Gildart played on the wing for the Dolphins in one pre-season NRL trials match. Otherwise, he played as a centre for Central Queensland Capras in the Queensland Cup. On 1 August, Gildart signed with English side Leigh Leopards until the end of the 2023 Super League season.

=== 2025 ===
On 18 September, Gildart played in Hull Kingston Rovers 2025 last game of the regular season in victory over Warrington to claim the League Leaders Shield. On 9 October, Gildart played in Hull Kingston Rovers 2025 Super League Grand Final victory over Wigan to claim the treble.

=== 2026 ===
On 19 February, Gildart played in Hull Kingston Rovers World Club Challenge victory against Brisbane.

== International career ==
In July 2018, Gildart was selected in the England Knights Performance Squad. Then, the 2019 Great Britain Lions tour of the Southern Hemisphere. His Great Britain test debut was against Tonga in 2019.

=== Career statistics ===
Club	Season	Appearances	Tries	Goals	F/G	Points
Wigan Warriors	2015	7	4			16
Workington Town	2015	2	0			0
Salford Red Devils	2015	3	1			4
Wigan Warriors	2016	30	12			48
Wigan Warriors	2017	20	15			60
Wigan Warriors	2018	29	13			52
Wigan Warriors	2019	34	12			48
Wigan Warriors	2020	9	5			20
Wigan Warriors	2021	14	4			16
Wests Tigers	2022	8	1			4
Sydney Roosters	2022	2	0			0
Central Queensland Capras	2023	12	5			20
Leigh Leopards	2023	8	4			16
Hull Kingston Rovers	2024	20	5			20
Hull Kingston Rovers	2025	17	11			44
Hull Kingston Rovers	2026	9	5			20
Total		224	97			388
