= Ryan Sutton =

English rugby league footballer

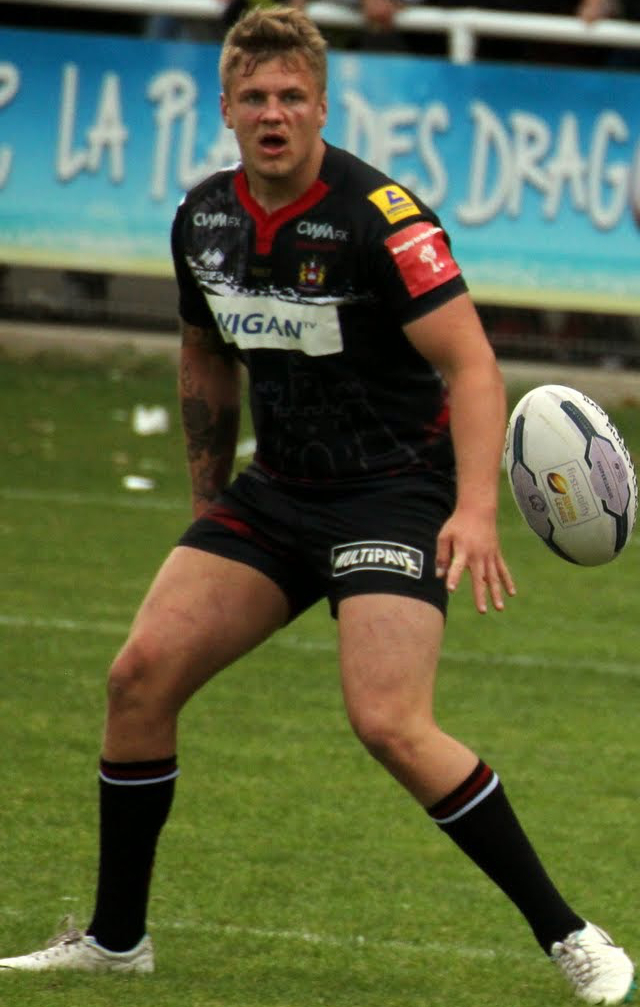

Personal information
- Born: 2 August 1995 (age 31) Wigan, England
- Height: 6 ft 2 in (1.88 m)
- Weight: 16 st 7 lb (105 kg)

Playing information
- Position: Prop, Loose forward
Club
Years	Team	Pld	T	G	FG	P
2014–18	Wigan Warriors	118	11	0	0	44
2015(loan)	→Workington Town	2	0	0	0	0
2019–22	Canberra Raiders	75	4	0	0	16
2023–25	Canterbury Bulldogs	13	0	0	0	0
2026–	Bradford Bulls	23	3	0	0	12
	Total	231	18	0	0	72
- Source: As of 18 September 2026

Ryan Sutton (born 2 August 1995) is an English rugby league footballer who plays as a prop and loose forward for the Bradford Bulls in the Super League.

He previously played for the Canberra Raiders and Canterbury Bulldogs in the NRL and the Wigan Warriors in the Super League, and on loan from Wigan at Workington Town in the Kingstone Press Championship.

== Background ==
Sutton was born in Billinge, Wigan, England. He played junior rugby league for Ince Rose Bridge.

== Career ==
=== Wigan Warriors ===
Sutton made his team début as a substitute on 21 April 2014 in an 84–6 sweep over the Bradford Bulls. He made his first starting appearance for Wigan against Salford.

He played in the 2016 Super League Grand Final victory over the Warrington Wolves at Old Trafford.

Sutton played in the 2017 Challenge Cup Final defeat by Hull F.C. at Wembley Stadium.

Sutton played in the 2018 Super League Grand Final victory over the Warrington Wolves at Old Trafford. Sutton signed with the Canberra Raiders for the 2019 NRL season.

=== Canberra Raiders ===
Sutton made a total of 20 appearances for Canberra in the 2019 NRL season as the club reached their first grand final in 25 years. He did not play in the 2019 NRL Grand Final in which Canberra were defeated by the Sydney Roosters 14-8 at ANZ Stadium. Sutton went on to play a total of 75 games for Canberra between 2019 and 2022.

=== Canterbury-Bankstown Bulldogs ===
On 3 March 2022, The Daily Telegraph reported that Sutton had signed a three-year deal with the Canterbury-Bankstown Bulldogs from 2023 onwards. He made his club debut in round 1 of the 2023 NRL season against the Manly-Warringah Sea Eagles which Canterbury lost 31-6. Sutton played a total of 13 matches for Canterbury in the 2023 NRL season as the club finished 15th on the table. On 18 March 2025, the Canterbury outfit released Sutton from the remainder of his playing conrtract. On 9 May 2025, it was reported that Sutton had signed a contract to join the Gold Coast for the remainder of the 2025 NRL season.

=== Bradford Bulls ===
On 18 November 2025 it was reported that he had signed for Bradford Bulls in the Super League on a 2-year deal.

== International career ==
In July 2018 he was selected in the England Knights Performance squad.

He was selected in England 9s squad for the 2019 Rugby League World Cup 9s.
