= Lee Mossop =

England international rugby league footballer

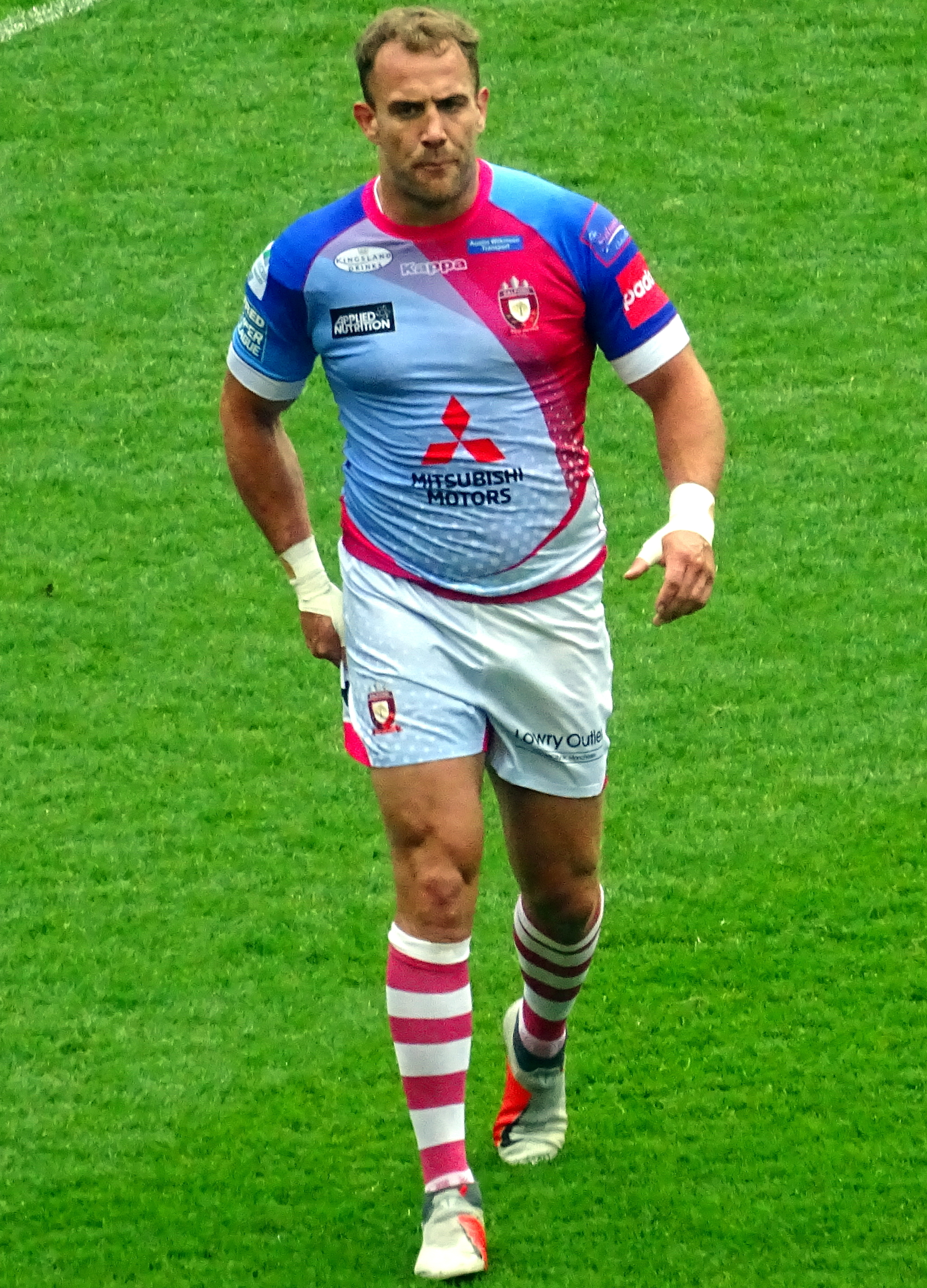

Personal information
- Full name: Lee Mossop
- Born: 17 January 1989 (age 37) Whitehaven, Cumbria, England

Playing information
- Height: 6 ft 4 in (1.93 m)
- Weight: 17 st 13 lb (114 kg)
- Position: Prop
Club
Years	Team	Pld	T	G	FG	P
2008–13	Wigan Warriors	95	7	0	0	28
2009(loan)	Barrow Raiders	1	0	0	0	0
2009(loan)	→ Huddersfield Giants	5	1	0	0	4
2014–15	Parramatta Eels	3	0	0	0	0
2015–16	Wigan Warriors	54	4	0	0	16
2015(loan)	→ Workington Town	1	0	0	0	0
2017–21	Salford Red Devils	79	7	0	0	28
	Total	238	19	0	0	76
Representative
Years	Team	Pld	T	G	FG	P
2011–21	England Knights	1	0	0	0	0
2012–13	England	5	0	0	0	0

Lee Mossop (born 17 January 1989) is an English retired professional rugby league footballer who played as a prop forward for the Salford Red Devils in the Super League and the England Knights and England at international level.

He previously played for the Wigan Warriors over two separate spells in the Super League, and on loan from Wigan at the Barrow Raiders and Workington Town in the Championship, and the Huddersfield Giants in the Super League. Mossop has also played for the Parramatta Eels in the NRL.

== Background ==
Mossop was born in Whitehaven, Cumbria, England.

Lee attended St John Rigby College in Orrell from 2005 to 2007 and gained A-levels in subjects such as Physical Education and Business Studies.

In his youth he played for amateur side Hensingham ARLFC.

== Playing career ==
=== 2000s ===
Mossop made his début in the Challenge Cup victory against Pia Donkeys on 20 April 2008. where he impressed scoring a try. He was involved in four games off the bench in total in 2008. He was given a three-year deal with Wigan in 2008.

In April 2009, Mossop was loaned to Barrow following an appearance for Wigan during their 2009 Challenge Cup fixture against Barrow. He impressed at Barrow making four appearances scoring a try.

In May 2009 it was announced that Lee would join Huddersfield on a month loan, and it was subsequently announced that Lee would be staying at Huddersfield on a season long loan with Wigan having the option to recall Lee at any time if needed.

In July 2009 it was announced that Lee would rejoin Wigan from his loan spell at Huddersfield due to injuries to captain Sean O'Loughlin and Harrison Hansen He went on to make 11 appearances that season, scoring 1 try.

=== 2010s ===
Mossop started 2010 brightly in Wigan colours and attracted interest from Australian NRL side Canterbury-Bankstown.

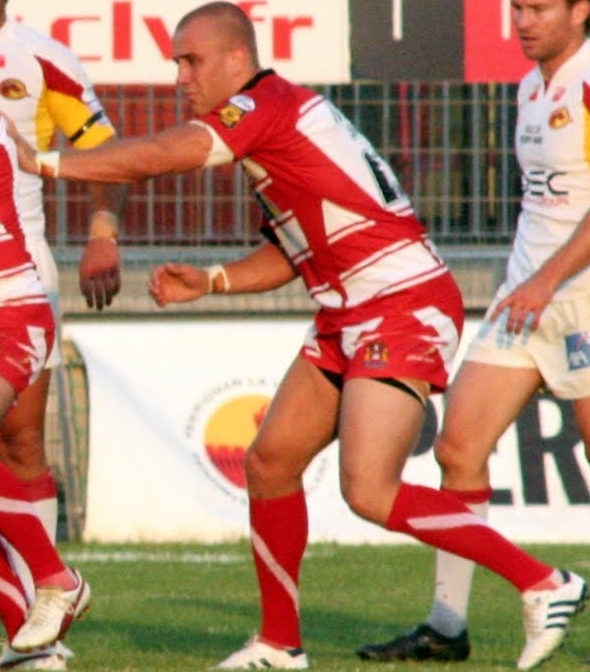
Mossop playing for Wigan in 2010

However, on 29 March 2010 Mossop signed a five-year deal at the Wigan club which would see him stay as a Cherry and White until the end of the 2014 season.

Mossop started the 2011 season as a prop and impressed many in that position. He made 29 appearances for Wigan in 2011's Super League XVI, scoring tries against Salford, Huddersfield and rivals St Helens in Wigan's 10–32 win at Widnes in June.

Mossop played in Wigan's 2011 Challenge Cup Final victory over the Leeds Rhinos at Wembley Stadium. He came on off the bench before having to leave the field after dislocating his shoulder. Mossop still came back on at half time despite his dislocated shoulder and played a pivotal role in the scoring of Jeff Lima's second try. Mossop helped Wigan towards their 18th Challenge Cup success.

In October 2011, Mossop was announced in the 22-man squad for the England Knights, a team of emerging Super League players and future England Rugby League stars. He played in two games for the Knights against France and his home-county, Cumbria, winning both of them.

In March 2012, England coach Steve McNamara announced his England Elite 32-man squad which Mossop was included in. This was Mossop's first inclusion in the England Rugby League first team squad.

He made his England first team début in the International origin game against the Exiles on 16 March 2012 where he came on off the bench. Josh Charnley and Carl Ablett also made their England débuts in this game. He backed up this England début by being picked again for the second and final Exiles game of the series. He also came off the bench in this game.

Mossop earned his first 3 England caps in the 2012 Autumn International series against France and Wales which England won. He came off the bench for the first game and managed to earn a starting spot at prop in the following two games.

On 23 April 2013 Wigan Warriors and Parramatta Eels announced that Mossop would be joining the NRL competition for two years commencing 2014.

Before leaving Wigan he played in the 2013 Challenge Cup Final victory over Hull F.C. at Wembley Stadium, and also in the 2013 Super League Grand Final victory over the Warrington Wolves at Old Trafford.

Mossop made his début for the Parramatta Eels on 6 June 2014 against the North Queensland Cowboys. After the match Mossop stated that "The Aussies like to rate the NRL competition as the best in the world and they're probably not wrong", "It's a lot faster but a lot of people expect it to be harder but I think Super League is a more physical competition". On 8 July 2014, after a match against the Melbourne Storm, it was revealed that Mossop would be out for the season after sustaining an injury to his left shoulder.

A season later, Mossop went on to rejoin Wigan after an injury hit stint in the NRL. During this second spell at Wigan he played in the 2015 Super League Grand Final defeat by the Leeds Rhinos at Old Trafford.

Mossop completed his move to Salford from Wigan on 3 November 2016. He played in the 2019 Super League Grand Final defeat by St. Helens at Old Trafford.

On 17 October 2020, he played in the 2020 Challenge Cup Final defeat for Salford against Leeds at Wembley Stadium. In round 11 of the 2021 Super League season, Mossop was sent off in Salford's match against Leeds after punching Konrad Hurrell.

On 9 August 2021 Mossop announced his immediate retirement as a rugby league player on medical advice. In the announcement Mossop said "... after seeing the surgeon last week, he has told me there are no more surgeries he can offer to help prolong my career anymore and instead, it will be one final operation to give me a better quality of life with my wife and young children".
