= Dominic Manfredi =

English professional rugby league footballer

Dom Manfredi
Personal information
- Full name: Dominic Manfredi
- Born: 1 October 1993 (age 33) Leigh, Greater Manchester, England

Playing information
- Height: 6 ft 0 in (1.84 m)
- Weight: 14 st 0 lb (89 kg)
- Position: Wing
Club
Years	Team	Pld	T	G	FG	P
2013–21	Wigan Warriors	82	57	0	0	228
2013(DR)	→ South Wales Scorpions	1	0	0	0	0
2014(loan)	→ Salford Red Devils	1	2	0	0	8
2014(DR)	→ Workington Town	2	1	0	0	4
2015(DR)	→ Workington Town	2	1	0	0	4
	Total	88	61	0	0	244

Dominic Manfredi (born 1 October 1993) is an English former professional rugby league footballer who played on the wing. He played for the Wigan Warriors in the Super League, but also spent time on loan at the South Wales Scorpions in Championship 1, Salford Red Devils in the Super League and Workington Town in the Championship.

== Background ==
Manfredi was born in Leigh, Greater Manchester, England. He started in Leigh Sacred Heart all the way through until year six, then carried on at St.Marys high school in Astley.

== Club career ==
=== Early career ===
Manfredi played his junior rugby at Leigh Miners Rangers until he was 14 and joined the Wigan club where he progressed well through the scholarship and academy set up.

=== Professional career ===
Signing for Wigan, Manfredi spent a period on loan with Championship 1 team South Wales Scorpions before making his Super League début against Hull FC on 3 August 2013, in a 33–34 defeat at the DW Stadium.

The following season, 2014, Manfredi made 14 appearances for Wigan scoring 11 tries as well periods playing for Super League rivals, Salford, and (then) Championship team, Workington.

In April 2015, Manfredi signed a new four-year contract with Wigan. Manfredi was again loaned to Workington however 2015 saw his true breakthrough into the Wigan set up. After a disappointing run of form for Josh Charnley he came into the side to score 22 tries in just 18 appearances as well as picking up two Man of the Match awards.

He played in the 2015 Super League Grand Final defeat by the Leeds Rhinos at Old Trafford.

At the start of the 2016 season he was given the number 5 jersey for Wigan after the departure of Joe Burgess to the NRL, and went on the score 15 tries in 25 appearances as well as three Man of the Match awards. His season was cut short in August due to an anterior cruciate ligament injury in a tackle by Rangi Chase against Castleford Tigers. Despite the injury he went on to make an appearance in the Super League Dream Team 2016.

Manfredi missed the entire 2017 season after suffering another injury in a match for the reserve team. He made his first team comeback on 14 September 2018, scoring two tries in a 26–6 victory over Warrington Wolves. The injury limited him to just 5 appearances in the 2018 season but one appearance was where he repeated the two-try feat against the Warrington Wolves in the 2018 Super League Grand Final, in a 12-4 victory at Old Trafford.

Injury again limited appearances in 2019 with him making just four starts for Wigan during the season. In 2020 he made comeback in the COVID-19 affected season making 11 appearances.

Part way through the 2021 season, Manfredi confirmed in a joint statement with the Wigan Warriors, that he would retire at the end of the 2021 season. He cited his repeated knee injuries as the main reason, and to put his physical and mental health before his playing career. However, on 4 August 2021, Manfredi announced his immediate retirement from rugby league, after being medically advised that he would require a complete replacement of the left knee.
