= Dom Crosby =

English former rugby league footballer

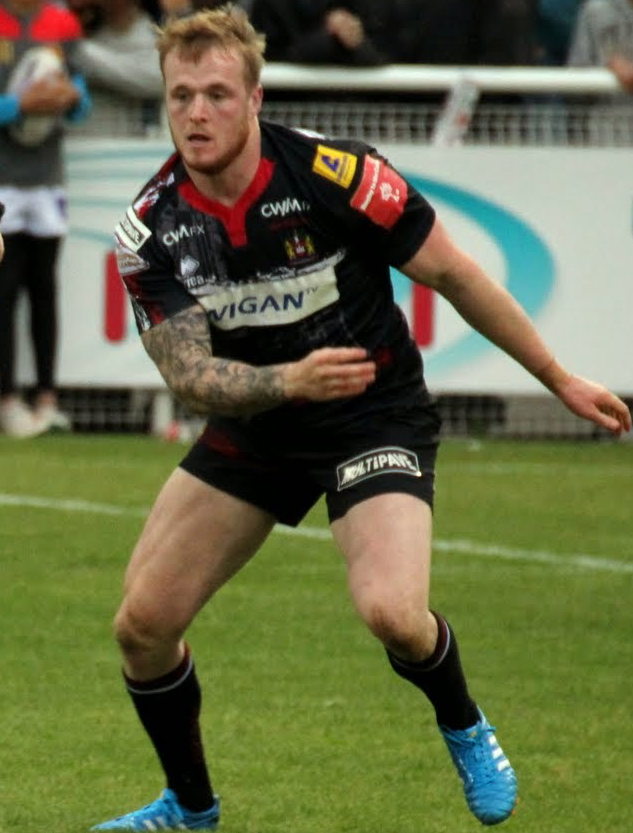

Personal information
- Full name: Dominic Crosby
- Born: 11 December 1990 (age 35) Wigan, Greater Manchester, England

Playing information
- Height: 6 ft 4 in (194 cm)
- Weight: 17 st 5 lb (110 kg)
- Position: Prop
Club
| Years | Team | Pld | T | G | FG | P |
|---|---|---|---|---|---|---|
| 2011–16 | Wigan Warriors | 102 | 7 | 0 | 0 | 28 |
| 2011(DR) | → Widnes Vikings | 10 | 2 | 0 | 0 | 8 |
| 2012(DR) | → S Wales Scorpions | 2 | 0 | 0 | 0 | 0 |
| 2013(DR) | → S Wales Scorpions | 1 | 1 | 0 | 0 | 4 |
| 2013(DR) | → Leigh Centurions | 1 | 0 | 0 | 0 | 0 |
| 2017–18 | Warrington Wolves | 17 | 0 | 0 | 0 | 0 |
| 2018(Loan) | → Leeds Rhinos | 7 | 0 | 0 | 0 | 0 |
| 2019–20 | Leeds Rhinos | 0 | 0 | 0 | 0 | 0 |
| | Total | 140 | 10 | 0 | 0 | 40 |

Dominic Crosby is a former rugby league footballer who last played as a prop for the Leeds Rhinos in the Super League.

He played for the Wigan Warriors in the Super League, and on loan from Wigan at the Widnes Vikings and the Leigh Centurions in the Championship, and the South Wales Scorpions in Championship 1. He played for the Warrington Wolves in the Super League, and spent time on from Warrington at Leeds ahead of a permanent move to Headingley.

== Background ==
Crosby was born in Wigan, Greater Manchester, England.

== Career ==
After spells with Widnes (2011) and South Wales Scorpions (2012) on dual registration terms he made his first team début for the Warriors in the 2012 Challenge Cup 4th round match against the North Wales Crusaders.

Crosby played in the 2013 Super League Grand Final victory over the Warrington Wolves at Old Trafford. Crosby played in the 2014 Super League Grand Final against St. Helens at Old Trafford. Crosby then played in the 2015 Super League Grand Final defeat against Leeds at Old Trafford. Crosby played in the 2016 Super League Grand Final victory against Warrington at Old Trafford.

=== Leeds Rhinos ===
On 1 September 2020, it was reported that he was forced to retire through injury.
