= Eddie Hemmings (rugby league) =

English rugby league commentator

Eddie Hemmings is an English rugby league commentator who was Sky Sports’ main commentator for the sport, before retiring in April 2019. Hailing from Aigburth, Merseyside, England, Hemmings became known for his commentary partnership with Mike Stephenson from 1988 to 2017. He is widely recognised as "the voice of rugby league" after a career spanning over 30 years in the sport. He and Andrew Voss are the two commentators for the video game Rugby League Live 4.

== Early career ==
Hemmings began his career on the now defunct Liverpool Weekly News, before moving to BBC Radio Merseyside, where he became sports editor, proceeding to become a sports reporter/commentator on BBC Radio 2 in the 1980s. Hemmings and Stephenson actually first met up for commentary duties at the station; Stephenson was invited to be Hemmings' summariser during Great Britain's tour of Australia in 1988.

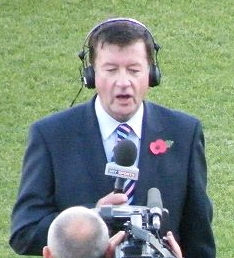
Hemmings presenting for Sky Sports during the 2008 Rugby League World Cup

== Television career ==
Hemmings joined satellite broadcaster BSB as the anchorman/commentator for its rugby league coverage at the network's launch in 1990. Stephenson was brought in to be Hemmings' regular sidekick. The pairing were kept together when BSB and Sky Television merged to form BSkyB; the combined satellite TV network inherited BSB's rugby league TV contract. Before this he was a Sports Reporter on the BBC regional news programme North West Tonight and was a presenter/co-presenter on the Saturday Teatime sports round-up Sport North West where he co-presented with Richard Duckenfield, Paul Craven, Andy Wyatt and sometimes presented on his own and the Friday Night BBC2 regional sports programme Sportsround and on network BBC a news/feature reporter on Grandstand and Sportsnight

Hemmings was the main caller for nearly all live Super League matches broadcast on Sky Sports; the two matches broadcast live each week, plus all the play-offs and Grand Final matches. Eddie and Stevo became household names and synonymous with Super League and Rugby League, providing the voices of the sport for the first 20 years of Super League before Stephenson retired in 2016.

On 1 March 2019, Hemmings announced his retirement from commentary and on 19 April 2019, he commentated on Wigan vs St Helens, his final Super League game for Sky Sports before retiring.
