= 2011 Challenge Cup =

Rugby league competition

2011 Carnegie Challenge Cup
- Duration: 9 Rounds
- Highest attendance: 78,482
- Broadcast partners: (United Kingdom) BBC Sport
- Winners: Wigan Warriors
- Runners-up: Leeds Rhinos
- Biggest home win: Warrington Wolves 112-0; Swinton Lions
- Biggest away win: Northumbria University 0-132; York City Knights
- Lance Todd Trophy: Jeff Lima

The 2011 Challenge Cup (also known as the Carnegie Challenge Cup for sponsorship reasons) was the 110th staging of the most competitive European rugby league tournament at club level and was open to teams from England, Wales, Scotland, France and Russia. It began its preliminary stages in January 2011. The Challenge Cup is Warrington Wolves were the reigning champions, but lost 24 - 44 at home to the Wigan Warriors in the quarter-finals, who went on to win the title after beating Leeds Rhinos 28 - 18 in the final. Rugby Football League chief executive Nigel Wood reported that in 2011 Challenge Cup viewing figures on BBC Television had increased by 21.3 per cent compared to 2010 and are 26.8 per cent higher than they were in 2009.

== Preliminary round ==
The draws for the Preliminary and First Round was made on 7 December 2010. Ties were played on 8–10 January with some ties played on 15–16 January.

=== Pool A ===
Home	Score	Away	Match Information
Home	Score	Away	Date and Time	Venue	Referee	Attendance
Oulton Raiders	23–22	Normanton Knights	15 January 2011 13:30	Raider Park	D Sharpe
Ovendon	26–28	Rochdale Mayfield	8 January 2011 13:30	Four Fields	T Mahar
Millom	8–12	Egremont Rangers	8 January 2011 13:30	Coronation Field	A Smith
Eccles and Salford Juniors	26–6	Castleford Panthers	8 January 2011 13:30	Moat Hall	R Cowling
Yorkshire Cup winners	0–0	Drighlington	Match cancelled		B Robinson
Shaw Cross Sharks ARLFC	20–21	Stanley Rangers	8 January 2011 13:30	Paul Hinchliffe Memorial	C Kendall
Bank Quay Bulls	26–18	Seaton Rangers	15 January 2011 13:30	Dallam Playing Fields	C Kendall

=== Pool B ===
Home	Score	Away	Match Information
Home	Score	Away	Date and Time	Venue	Referee	Attendance
St Albans Centurions	22–32	British Police	9 January 2011 14:00	Pennine Way	S Davis	50
Loughborough University	38–0	Featherstone Lions	16 January 2011 13:30	Loughborough University	J Bloem
Northampton Demons	46–10	Gloucester University	16 January 2011 13:30	Rushmills	P Marklove

== Round 1 ==
First Round played weekend of 22 January with some ties played weekend of 29 January and 5 February. The match between Kells and Bradford Dudley Hill took place on 12 February.

=== Pool A ===
Home	Score	Away	Match Information
Home	Score	Away	Date and Time	Venue	Referee	Attendance
East Leeds	36–10	Crosfields	22 January 2011 13:30	Richmond Hill	G Evans
East Hull	24–10	Saddleworth Rangers	22 January 2011 13:30	Rosmead Sports Centre	B Robinson
Leigh East	58–6	Heworth	22 January 2011 13:30	Ledgard Street	A Smith
Fryston Warriors	30–4	Stanningley	22 January 2011 13:30	Askham Road	D Sharpe
Eccles and Salford Juniors	6–30	Wigan St Patricks	29 January 2011 13:30	Moat Hall	P Marklove	85
Wigan St Judes	22–20	West Bowling	29 January 2011 13:30	Parsons Meadow	J Cobb
Skirlaugh Bulls	16–14	Oulton Raiders	22 January 2011 13:30	Eastside Sports Centre	T Crashley
Wath Brow Hornets	18–0	Norland Sharks	30 January 2011 13:30	Cleator	D Sharp
Rochdale Mayfield	38–14	Bank Quay Bulls	22 January 2011 13:30	Mayfield Sports Centre	T Mahar
Drighlington	12–13	Hunslet Warriors	22 January 2011 13:30	Wakefield Road	A Gill
York Acorn	24–35	Milford Marlins	5 February 2011 13:30	Thanet Road	A Sweet
Stanley Rangers	24–10	Widnes St Maries	29 January 2011 13:30	Stanley Sports and Social Club	M Woodhead
Elland	16–20	Thatto Heath Crusaders	22 January 2011 13:30	Greetland Community Centre	C Brathwaite
Kells	14–22	Bradford Dudley Hill	12 February 2011 13:30	Ravenhill Lane	S Mikalauskas
Myton Warriors	34–0	Ince Rose Bridge	22 January 2011 13:30	Marist Sporting Club	M Craven
Siddal	58–18	Eastmoor Dragons	30 January 2011 13:30	Siddal Sports Centre	C Kendall
Oldham St Annes	16–30	Hull Dockers	22 January 2011 13:30	Higginshaw Road	L Fellows
Castleford Lock Lane	38–4	Halton Sims Cross	30 January 2011 13:30	Lock Lane Sports Centre	R Jones
Leigh Miners Rangers	28–10	West Hull	22 January 2011 13:30	Twist Lane	N Aspey
Waterhead	24–28	Egremont Rangers	30 January 2011 13:30	Waterhead Park	C Hancock

=== Pool B ===
Home	Score	Away	Match Information
Home	Score	Away	Date and Time	Venue	Referee	Attendance
Loughborough University	18–10	Kippax Knights	22 January 2011 13:30	Loughborough University	P Stockman
Northampton Demons	12–26	Leeds Met University	22 January 2011 13:30	Rushmills	S Ansell
Nottingham Outlaws	30–32	RAF	22 January 2011 13:30	Highfields	R Webb
Warrington Wizards	44–18	Carluke Tigers	23 January 2011 13:30	Wilderspool Stadium	S Barrie
University of Central Lancashire	12–20	Northumbria University	22 January 2011 13:30	University of Central Lancashire	S Mikalauskas
Edge Hill University	28–16	Hull University	2 February 2011 19:30	Edge Hill University	J Bloem
Royal Navy	28–14	British Police	22 January 2011 13:30	Torpoint	M Hague
Valley Cougars	24–30	The Army	23 January 2011 13:30	The Park Nelson	M Woodhead

== Round 2 ==
The draw for the Second Round was made on 24 January. Ties played weekend of 5 February with some ties played weekend of 12 February. The match between Fryston Warriors and Bradford Dudley Hill took place on 19 February.

=== Pool A ===
Home	Score	Away	Match Information
Home	Score	Away	Date and Time	Venue	Referee	Attendance
East Leeds	4–64	Hull Dockers	5 February 2011 13:30	Richmond Hill	T Crashley
Castleford Lock Lane	18–16	Stanley Rangers	5 February 2011 13:30	Lock Lane Sports Centre	C Kendall
Milford Marlins	24–16	Skirlaugh Bulls	12 February 2011 14:00	Milford Sports Club	S Ansell
Wigan St Patricks	16–18	Leigh Miners Rangers	5 February 2011 13:30	Harper Street	J Bloem
Hunslet Warriors	22–16	Wigan St Judes	5 February 2011 13:30	The Oval	A Gill
Fryston Warriors	16–12	Bradford Dudley Hill	19 February 2011 14:00	Askham Road	B Robinson
Rochdale Mayfield	12–25	Siddal	12 February 2011 14:30	Mayfield Sports Centre	T Mahar
East Hull	31–22	Myton Warriors	5 February 2011 13:30	Rosmead Sports Centre	C Halloran
Egremont Rangers	22–10	Wath Brow Hornets	5 February 2011 13:30	North Road	J Cobb
Leigh East	16–18	Thatto Heath Crusaders	5 February 2011 13:30	Ledgard Street	D Sharpe

=== Pool B ===
Home	Score	Away	Match Information
Home	Score	Away	Date and Time	Venue	Referee	Attendance
The Army	27–16	RAF	5 February 2011 13:30	Aldershot Rugby Stadium	P Stockman
Loughborough University	18–25	Northumbria University	5 February 2011 13:30	Holywell Park	J Leahy
Warrington Wizards	28–20	Royal Navy	6 February 2011 13:30	Wilderspool Stadium	P Brooke
Leeds Metropolitan University	44–14	Hull University	5 February 2011 13:30	Leeds Metropolitan University	B Robinson

== Round 3 ==
Third Round draw was made on 15 February. Ties were played on weekend of 5 March.

Home	Score	Away	Match Information
Home	Score	Away	Date and Time	Venue	Referee	Attendance
Siddal	6–54	Widnes Vikings	6 March 2011 11:30	The Shay	D Sharpe	951
Milford Marlins	16–38	Gateshead Thunder	5 March 2011 14:30	West Park Leeds RUFC	C Halloran	400
London Skolars	60–24	Egremont Rangers	5 March 2011 15:30	New River Stadium	G Stokes	342
Oldham R.L.F.C.	28–16	Hunslet Warriors	6 March 2011 15:00	Whitebank Stadium	C Leatherbarrow	538
Batley Bulldogs	64–10	Fryston Warriors	6 March 2011 14:00	Mount Pleasant	W Turley	774
Sheffield Eagles	82–0	Leeds Met University	6 March 2011 15:00	Don Valley Stadium	M Kidd	350
Whitehaven	14–27	Lézignan Sangliers	5 March 2011 18:00	Recreation Ground	M Thomason	651
Hunslet Hawks	48–10	Warrington Wizards	6 March 2011 15:00	South Leeds Stadium	T Mahar	316
Rochdale Hornets	22–20	Workington Town	6 March 2011 15:00	Spotland Stadium	T Roby	358
Featherstone Rovers	86–0	British Army	5 March 2011 14:00	Bigfellas Stadium	D Merrick	723
Doncaster	34–22	Thatto Heath Crusaders	5 March 2011 15:00	Keepmoat Stadium	B Robinson	352
Northumbria University	0–132	York City Knights	6 March 2011 15:00	Huntington Stadium	J Cobb	434
South Wales Scorpions	6–62	Dewsbury Rams	6 March 2011 15:00	The Gnoll	J Leahy	356
Leigh Miners Rangers	26–56	Barrow Raiders	5 March 2011 14:30	Leigh Sports Village	R Cowling	633
Keighley Cougars	16–10	Toulouse Olympique	5 March 2011 18:00	Cougar Park	R Laughton	479
Leigh Centurions	68–24	Hull Dockers	6 March 2011 15:00	Leigh Sports Village	T Crashley	1,083
Swinton Lions	44–4	East Hull	5 March 2011 13:45	The Willows	P Brooke	305
Halifax	76–6	Castleford Lock Lane	6 March 2011 15:00	The Shay	C Sharrad	1,684

== Round 4 ==
Fourth round draw was made on 20 March. Ties were played on weekend of 7 May.

Home	Score	Away	Match Information
Home	Score	Away	Date and Time	Venue	Referee	Attendance
Leigh Centurions	16–22	Catalans Dragons	6 May 2011 20:00	Leigh Sports Village	J Child	2,237
Gateshead Thunder	0–70	Harlequins	6 May 2011 20:00	Gateshead International Stadium	C Halloran	402
Hull FC	82–0	Oldham R.L.F.C.	7 May 2011 13:00	KC Stadium	C Leatherbarrow	6,235
St. Helens	52–26	Sheffield Eagles	7 May 2011 15:00	Stobart Stadium	B Thaler	3,563
Leeds Rhinos	30–20	Crusaders	7 May 2011 15:15	Headingley Stadium	S Ganson	10,954
Featherstone Rovers	42–16	Lézignan Sangliers	7 May 2011 18:30	Bigfellas Stadium	R Laughton	827
York City Knights	22–64	Hull Kingston Rovers	8 May 2011 15:00	Huntington Stadium	G Hewer	2,463
Warrington Wolves	80–0	Keighley Cougars	8 May 2011 15:00	Halliwell Jones Stadium	G Stokes	6,583
Wigan Warriors	52–0	Barrow Raiders	8 May 2011 15:00	DW Stadium	T Roby	8,026
London Skolars	18–62	Widnes Vikings	8 May 2011 15:00	New River Stadium	C Sharrad	415
Batley Bulldogs	18–28	Huddersfield Giants	8 May 2011 15:00	Mount Pleasant	R Hicks	2,676
Dewsbury Rams	38–44	Swinton Lions	8 May 2011 15:00	Ram Stadium	J Leahy	692
Hunslet Hawks	2–68	Salford City Reds	8 May 2011 15:00	South Leeds Stadium	W Turley	649
Rochdale Hornets	10–72	Castleford Tigers	8 May 2011 15:00	Spotland Stadium	T Alibert	1,675
Doncaster	10–50	Wakefield Trinity Wildcats	8 May 2011 15:00	Keepmoat Stadium	M Thomason	1,823
Halifax	34–46	Bradford Bulls	8 May 2011 15:15	The Shay	P Bentham	5,045

== Round 5 ==
Home	Score	Away	Match Information
Home	Score	Away	Date and Time	Venue	Referee	Attendance
Leeds Rhinos	40–20	Harlequins	20 May 2011 20:00	Headingley Stadium	B Thaler	7,147
Salford City Reds	0–25	Hull Kingston Rovers	20 May 2011 20:00	The Willows	T Alibert	2,087
Warrington Wolves	112–0	Swinton Lions	20 May 2011 20:00	Halliwell Jones Stadium	T Roby	4,440
Wakefield Trinity Wildcats	18–20	Castleford Tigers	21 May 2011 14:30	The Rapid Solicitors Stadium	R Silverwood	6,604
Widnes Vikings	26–50	Hull	21 May 2011 15:00	Stobart Stadium	R Hicks	3,387
Huddersfield Giants	30–16	Catalans Dragons	22 May 2011 15:00	Galpharm Stadium	P Bentham	3,198
St. Helens	70–0	Featherstone Rovers	22 May 2011 15:00	Stobart Stadium	J Child	2,905
Bradford Bulls	22–26	Wigan Warriors	22 May 2011 15:30	Grattan Stadium	S Ganson	5,828

== Quarter finals ==
Home	Score	Away	Match Information
Home	Score	Away	Date and Time	Venue	Referee	Attendance
Warrington Wolves	24–44	Wigan Warriors	23 July 2011 16:30	Halliwell Jones Stadium	R Silverwood	13,024
Hull F.C.	22–38	Leeds Rhinos	24 July 2011 15:30	KC Stadium	S Ganson	9,496
Castleford Tigers	22–18	Huddersfield Giants	24 July 2011 15:30	PROBIZ Colliseum	P Bentham	6,336
St. Helens	54–6	Hull Kingston Rovers	24 July 2011 15:00	Stobart Stadium	B Thaler	6,449

== Semi finals ==
6 August 2011
16:30

Wigan Warriors	18–12	St. Helens

Halliwell Jones Stadium
Attendance: 12,713
Referee: Richard Silverwood

7 August 2011
15:15

Castleford Tigers	8–10 aet	Leeds Rhinos

Keepmoat Stadium
Attendance: 13,158
Referee: Phil Bentham

== Final ==
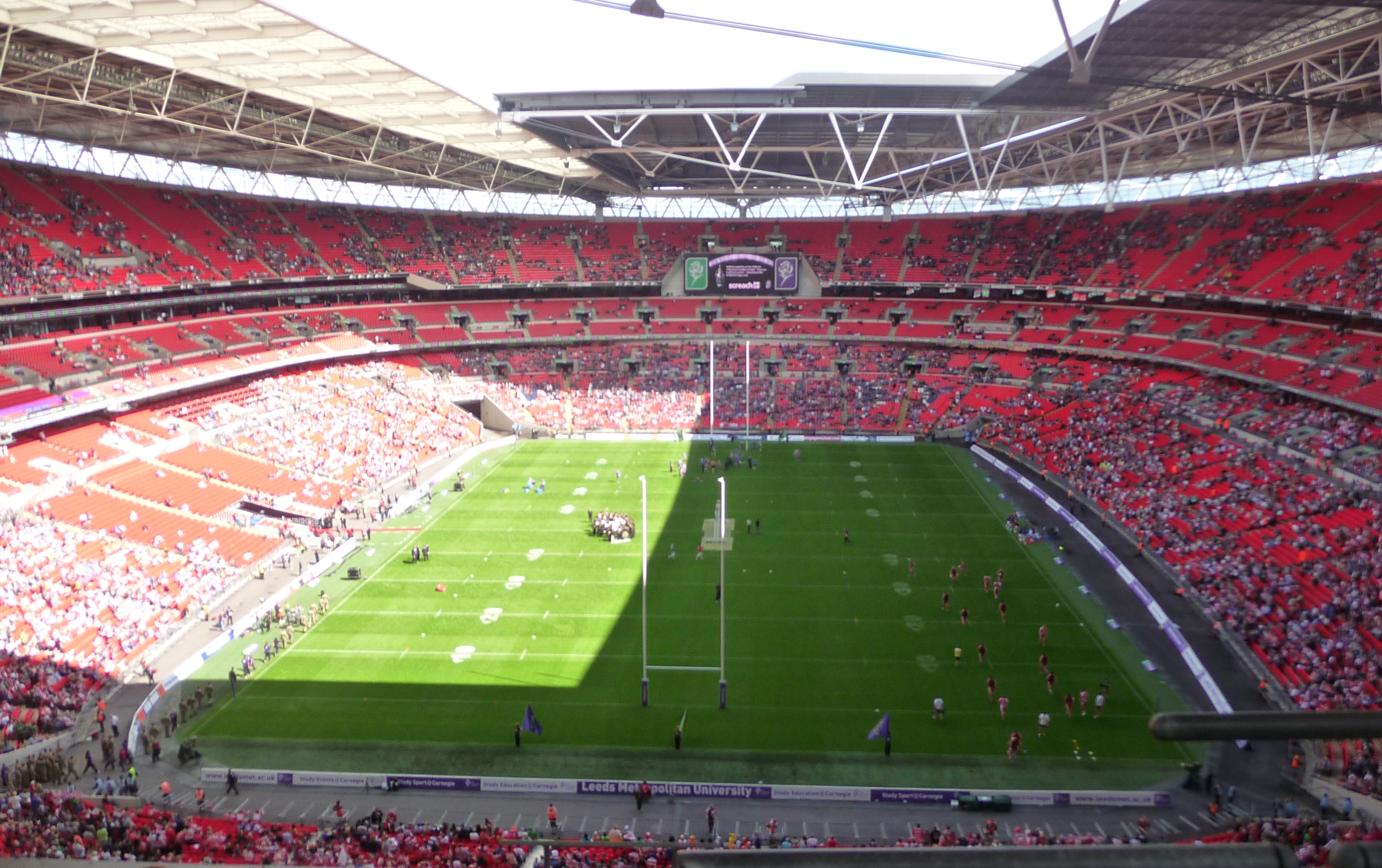
Teams warming up before the final at Wembley Stadium

The two sides with the most Challenge Cup Final appearances had only met twice before, Wigan winning both times (1994 and 1995). Leeds had played in the previous year's Challenge Cup final loss, but it was the Wigan's Warriors' first visit to the new Wembley Stadium. Abide with me was sung by Rhydian Roberts.

The game was broadcast by BBC with John Kear and Dave Woods commentating, as well as additional commentary from Tanya Arnold, Clare Balding, Jonathan Davies, Robbie Hunter-Paul, Justin Morgan and Brian Noble. The English national anthem was then sung before referee Phil Bentham, overseeing his first Challenge Cup final, blew time on and Leeds's captain Kevin Sinfield kicked off.

Saturday, 27 August
14:30

Leeds Rhinos
Tries
Ryan Hall (2)
Ben Jones-Bishop
Carl Ablett

Goals
Kevin Sinfield

18 - 28
Report

Wigan Warriors
Tries
Jeff Lima (2)
Josh Charnley
Joel Tomkins
Thomas Leuluai

Goals
Pat Richards (4)

Wembley Stadium, London (England)
Attendance: 78,482
Referee: Phil Bentham (England)
Player of the Match: Jeff Lima (New Zealand)

Leeds Rhinos	Posit.	Wigan Warriors
1 Brent Webb	FB	1 Sam Tomkins
23 Ben Jones-Bishop	WG	25 Josh Charnley
19 Kallum Watkins	CE	12 Joel Tomkins
12 Carl Ablett	CE	4 George Carmont
5 Ryan Hall	WG	5 Pat Richards
13 Kevin Sinfield (c)	SO	6 Paul Deacon
6 Danny McGuire	SH	17 Brett Finch
8 Kylie Leuluai	PR	10 Andy Coley
9 Danny Buderus	HK	7 Thomas Leuluai
10 Jamie Peacock	PR	15 Jeff Lima
11 Jamie Jones-Buchanan	SR	11 Harrison Hansen
3 Brett Delaney	SR	16 Ryan Hoffman
20 Weller Hauraki	LF	13 Sean O'Loughlin (c)
7 Rob Burrow	Int.	9 Michael McIlorum
16 Ryan Bailey	Int.	14 Paul Prescott
17 Ian Kirke	Int.	21 Lee Mossop
21 Chris Clarkson	Int.	22 Liam Farrell
Brian McDermott	Coach	Michael Maguire

== UK Broadcasting rights ==
Selected matches were televised solely by the BBC, for the last time. The following season the BBC and Sky Sports shared a selected round 4 and round 5 match and the BBC televising two quarter final matches and Sky Sports televising the other two quarter finals. The BBC still televised the semi-finals and the final.

Round	Live match	Date	BBC channel
Round 4	Leeds Rhinos 30 - 20 Crusaders; Halifax 34 - 46 Bradford Bulls	May 7, 2011; May 8, 2011	BBC One (First half)/BBC Two (Second half)^{1} BBC Two
Round 5	Wakefield Trinity Wildcats 18 - 20 Castleford Tigers; Bradford Bulls 22 - 26 Wigan Warriors	May 21, 2011; May 22, 2011	BBC One^{2} BBC Two
Quarter finals	Warrington Wolves 24 - 44 Wigan Warriors; Hull F.C. 22 - 38 Leeds Rhinos	July 23, 2011; July 24, 2011	BBC Two
Semi finals	Wigan Warriors 18 - 12 St. Helens; Castleford Tigers 8 - 10 aet Leeds Rhinos	August 6, 2011; August 7, 2011	BBC Two
Final	Leeds Rhinos 18 - 28 Wigan Warriors	Saturday August 27	BBC One

^{1} Except Northern Ireland.

^{2} Except Scotland which was televised live on BBC Two Scotland.
