= 2009 Challenge Cup final =

Rugby league match in the United Kingdom

2009 Challenge Cup Final
| Huddersfield Giants | Warrington Wolves |
|---|---|
| 16 | 25 |
| | 1 | 2 | Total |
|---|---|---|---|
| HUD | 10 | 6 | 16 |
| WAR | 18 | 7 | 25 |
- Date: 29 August 2009
- Stadium: Wembley Stadium
- Location: London, United Kingdom
- Lance Todd Trophy winner: Michael Monaghan
- God Save The Queen and Abide with Me: Hayley Westenra
- Referee: Steve Ganson
- Attendance: 76,560

Broadcast partners
- Broadcasters: BBC Sport
- Commentators: Dave Woods

The 2009 Carnegie Challenge Cup Final was played on 29 August 2009 at Wembley Stadium, in London between the Huddersfield Giants and the Warrington Wolves. It was the first Challenge Cup final since 1985–86 that any of the 'Big Four' (Bradford, Leeds, St Helens, and Wigan) had failed to reach. It was the second final in four years for Huddersfield following their appearance in the 2006 final, but their first appearance at Wembley Stadium in forty-seven years.

En route to the final, Warrington defeated Wigan 39–26 in their semi final at the Stobart Stadium Halton in Widnes on 8 August 2009, and on the day after Huddersfield beat holders St Helens 24–14 in Warrington's Halliwell Jones Stadium.

== Route to final ==
Due to the way teams at different professional levels are introduced into the tournament, the number of rounds needed to reach a Challenge Cup final depends on the team, and the league they play in. For a Super League team to reach a final, they must have played four rounds. Five rounds must have been played for a team playing in the Co-operative Championship, and for an amateur or foreign club, the number varies depending on which round they entered the competition. Because both Warrington Wolves and Huddersfield Giants are Super League clubs, they both entered the competition in the fourth round, receiving byes in the third.

=== Warrington Wolves ===
| Rnd | Home team | Score | Away team |
|---|---|---|---|
| 1-3 | BYE | | |
| 4 | Warrington Wolves [SL] | 56 – 10 | York City Knights [C1] |
| 5 | Featherstone Rovers [CC] | 8 – 56 | Warrington Wolves [SL] |
| QF | Hull Kingston Rovers [SL] | 24 – 25 | Warrington Wolves [SL] |
| SF | Wigan Warriors [SL] | 26 – 39 | Warrington Wolves [SL] |
SL = Super League, CC = Co-operative Championship, C1 = Championship One; Neutral semi-final venue: Stobart Stadium Halton, Widnes

Warrington's cup-run started with a home tie to Championship One part-timers the York City Knights. Their last meeting in the Challenge cup in 2000 resulted in a near-whitewashing 84–1 defeat. Lee Briers replaced Michael Monaghan at scrum-half while Hicks took over kicking duties, with Martin Gleeson left out over speculation of a move to Wigan Warriors, which eventually came true. Warrington scored first thanks to a try from Simon Grix in the second minute, but York struck back immediately afterwards to take the lead with an effort from fullback; Danny Ratcliffe. Vinnie Anderson and Ben Harrison both scored tries which were converted before sloppy defence allowed Paul Hughes to score an opportunist York try midway through the first half. Warrington took a half time lead of 28–10 thanks to Ben Westwood and the first try of the season for Michael Cooper. Warrington kept a clean sheet in the second half, as they doubled their first half tally. Tries from Chris Bridge, Lee Briers, Vinnie Anderson, Louis Anderson and Paul Johnson took the game away from York, a cause not helped by the sending off of prop; Danny Ekis after 64 minutes The game finished 52–10, with Garreth Carvell returning from injury to pick up the man of the match award.

Their fifth round match was a fixture away at the Featherstone Rovers' Chris Moyles Stadium in which they again scored 56 points. The game was fullback Richard Mathers' debut for the Wolves following his transfer from the Wigan Warriors in exchange for Martin Gleeson. Rovers scored first thanks to Tommy Saxton on the wing, and threatened to score another, although an interception from Hicks was returned for a 70-metre try. Monoghan then set up Mathers in support who scored the away team's second try. A deflected kick picked up by Westwood provided another Warrington try for Monaghan. Although a knock-on from Chris Riley gave the Featherstone Rovers good field position, they failed to score, and Warrington extended the lead to 8–20 at half time thanks to a try from Paul Wood. Warrington scored first after the break following some tidy passing between Monoghan and Jon Clarke, with Hicks eventually scoring the try, before the Featherstone Rovers scored their second and last try of the match through Tom Haughey. A further Warrington try from Hicks, as well as a try worked by ex-Wigan pair Mickey Higham and Mathers were followed by tries from Harrison, Riley and Bridge to end the game comprehensively in Warrington's favour, with ten tries in total being scored by the away side.

On 30 May, Hull witnessed only the second ever Challenge Cup game to be decided by the golden point rule, as Hull Kingston Rovers proved a tougher outfit than both of Warrington's previous sub-Super League opponents. Hull Kingston Rovers started better, and seized the initiative after just three minutes, with Paul Cooke's long pass to Peter Fox proving an opportunity for Kris Welham. Despite multiple handling errors from Simon Grix, the home side failed to extend their lead. Two goal-line dropouts eventually lead to Vinnie Anderson crashing over the try-line on the 16th minute, in front of the post; Chris Bridge converted to level the scores 6–6, which it remained until half-time thanks to a last resort tackle from fullback Shaun Briscoe to deny Ben Harrison a try. Monaghan retreated from the match in the 31st minute, but Warrington took the lead at the start of the second half when Jon Clarke finished off a Matt King break on the wing. Hull Kingston Rovers replied with two tries of their own in five minutes, from Clint Newton, and later Ben Galea following a kick from Paul Cooke which deceived Richie Mathers. With the scores already 18–12, Rovers extended their lead further on the hour with a break that covered half the "New" Craven Park pitch from Jake Webster. Matt King plucked Lee Briers' kick into the corner for a Warrington try and Chris Bridge made the scores level with another try in the 70th minute. Bridge converted his own try to give Warrington a slender two-point lead before a penalty conceded for offside provided Michael Dobson with an opportunity to level the game again. A knock on from the resulting kick-off gave Lee Briers a chance to land a drop goal, but he sliced the ball, forcing the game into extra time. He missed two further chances, before kicking the ball between the uprights in front of the visiting Warrington fans in the 85th minute.

This victory set up a semi-final date with Wigan Warriors, the most successful team in the Challenge Cup's history, at the Stobart Stadium Halton in Widnes. Despite a third minute Ben Westwood try disallowed by video referee Phil Bentham for obstruction, Warrington again fell behind before replying strongly, with Phil Bailey returning from injury to give Wigan a 6–0 lead after seven minutes, before Pat Richards scored his 1000th Wigan career point with a penalty goal to extend the lead by a further two points. Bailey was soon withdrawn with an injury to his Achilles which ended his match day. Three tries came in quick succession as Warrington struck back, with Matt King bursting through four defenders, Louis Anderson taking advantage of a mistake from Amos Roberts, and Briers weaving through the defensive line to take the scores to 18–8 following three successful conversions from Chris Bridge. Although Andy Coley was held over the try-line, Wigan's attack on the Warrington line was otherwise dull, and further tries from Michael Cooper and Matt King put the game beyond the Warriors by half-time. Warrington scored first in the second half, with Matt King gathering the high ball from Lee Briers unopposed to complete his hat-trick. A spirited Wigan fightback followed thanks to Warrington handling errors in their own half, with Sam Tomkins gathering his own kick for a try in the 55th minute, Andy Coley scoring from a Paul Prescott offload, and Thomas Leuluai defeating Richie Mathers in a one-on-one tackle. Richards' perfect kicking game reduced the margin to just six points, before a Lee Briers drop goal from thirty metres out and a Chris Hicks try put the game once again beyond Wigan's reach.

=== Huddersfield Giants ===
| Rnd | Home team | Score | Away team |
|---|---|---|---|
| 1-3 | BYE | | |
| 4 | Harlequins RL [SL] | 16 – 42 | Huddersfield Giants [SL] |
| 5 | Huddersfield Giants [SL] | 38 – 12 | Rochdale Hornets [CC] |
| QF | Huddersfield Giants [SL] | 16 – 14 | Castleford Tigers [SL] |
| SF | St Helens R.F.C. [SL] | 14 – 24 | Huddersfield Giants [SL] |
SL = Super League, CC = Co-operative Championship; Neutral semi-final venue: Halliwell Jones Stadium, Warrington

== Pre-match ==
The cup final curtain raiser, a match contesting the Year 7 boys Champion Schools was between Outwood Grange College of Wakefield and Castleford High School.

Classical soprano Hayley Westenra was the headline pre-match entertainment, performing the cup final anthem, "Abide with Me", and the British national anthem. Supporting Westenra were the Black Dyke Band and the ACM Gospel Choir.

Players from the 1975 final, played by Warrington and Widnes and including Mike Nicholas, 'Big' Jim Mills and Doug Laughton, were re-united before kick-off.

The coaches for both teams were from the same part of New South Wales and had even played together for the St. George Dragons in their 1993 NSWRL season grand final loss to the Brisbane Broncos.

The BBC broadcasting team included commentators Dave Woods and Jonathan Davies, presenters Clare Balding, Robbie Paul, Damian Johnson and Tanya Arnold and experts Justin Morgan and Brian Noble, the coaches of Hull Kingston Rovers and Wigan Warriors respectively.

== Match ==
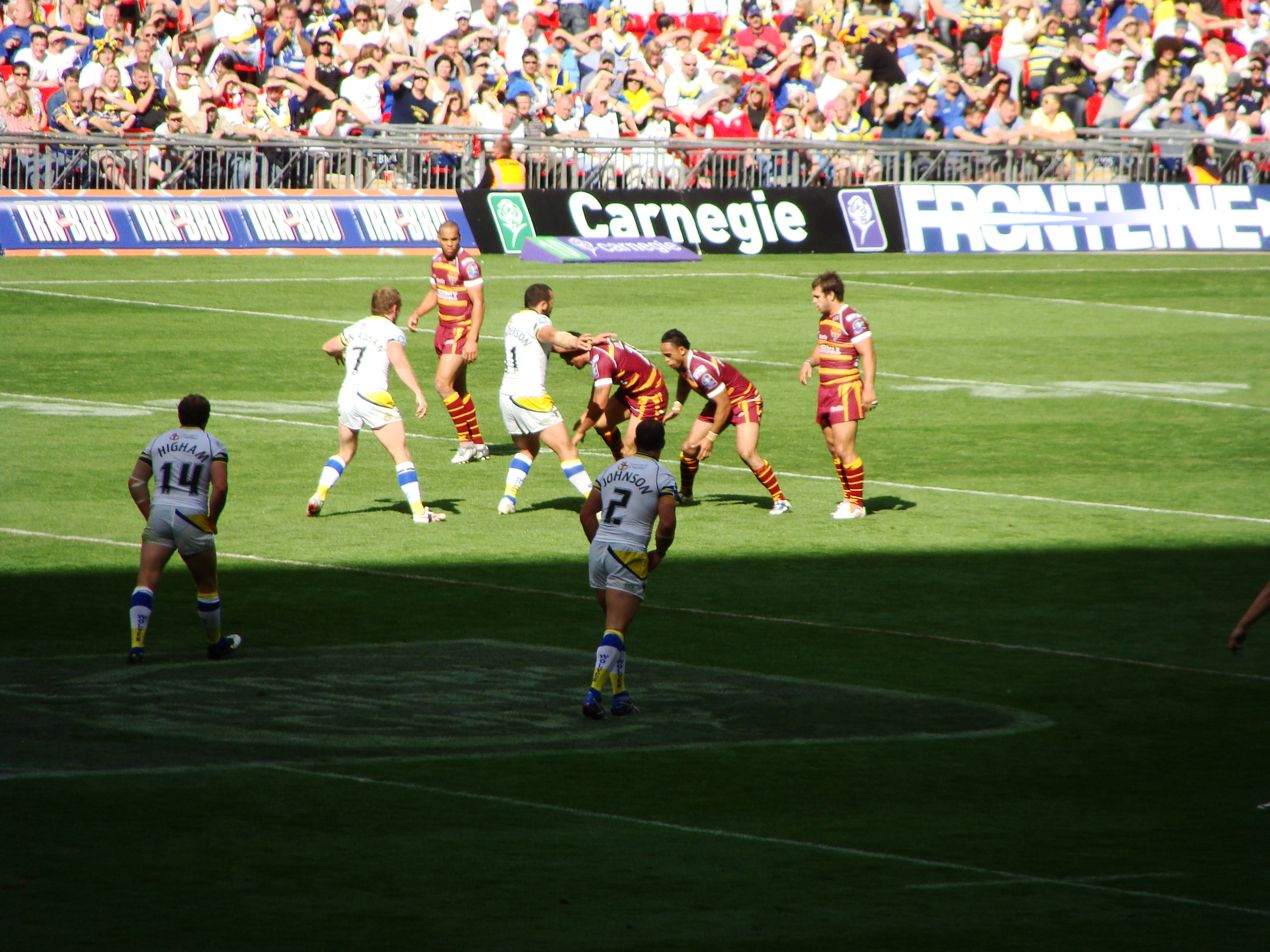
Giants playing the ball following a tackle

=== First half ===
Warrington kicked off and after the game's first set of six tackles, Brett Hodgson's clearing kick was charged down by Louis Anderson who re-gathered and was tackled close to Huddersfield's try-line. Moments later, in only the second minute of the game, Richie Mathers from close range barged over between the uprights and the video referee ruled that a Huddersfield hand had not prevented him from grounding the ball on the line. Chris Bridge's straightforward conversion put the Wolves ahead 6–nil. Just on the seven-minute mark, after repeat sets attacking Warrington's line, Huddersfield's Shaun Lunt appeared to have scored a similar try, forcing his way to the line beneath the uprights to put the ball down, although it was controversially denied by the video referee, who ruled a double movement. However, in the 9th minute, the Giants were working the ball out of their own half when David Faiumu offloaded from a tackle to a flying Brett Hodgson who then drew the fullback in and passed to Lunt who outran the defence to score. Hodgson successfully kicked the extras so the scores were level at 6 all. Only about two minutes later Warrington replied with another close-range try, this time from Michael Monaghan running from dummy half and stretching out from the tackle to put the ball down. Bridge made no mistake with the conversion so the Wolves' lead was 12–6. Then in the fifteenth minute Warrington scored again, moving the ball out to the right to Chris Hicks' wing where he crossed, improving the field position for his kicker before putting the ball down. Bridges kicked the goal, pushing the Wolves' lead out to 18–6, with less than a quarter of the match played. Shortly after, Warrington appeared to have scored again when Matt King leapt for a Lee Briers bomb and came down with the ball over the line. However the video referee ruled that he'd taken the ball from a Huddersfield defender's hands in mid-air so it was disallowed. In the 24th minute, Huddersfield got repeat sets in Warrington's half and worked the ball out to the left wing where David Hodgson crossed untouched, but again the video referee disallowed the try, this time the video referee ruled that a member of the Warrington defence had been taken out. Huddersfield continued to dominate possession and field position and eventually, less than four minutes from half-time, after keeping the ball alive they scored out on the right hand side through Brett Hodgson. He missed the difficult conversion attempt so the score was 18–10 in favour of Warrington and would remain at that till the half-time siren.

=== Second half ===
After the break, the contest became quite an even arm wrestle and no points were scored until the sixtieth minute, when from about fifteen metres out from Huddersfield's line, Michael Monaghan ran from dummy half then passed from the tackle to Vinnie Anderson who hit a big gap and crashed over under the posts. The kick for Bridge was simple so the score was 24–10 in Warrington's favour. Four minutes later Huddersfield were penalised for a high tackle on Lee Briers by Scott Moore less than thirty metres from their line. Warrington decided to take the shot at goal and Bridge missed his first kick of the day so the score remained unchanged. The Wolves then successfully kept Huddersfield penned up in their own half, protecting their lead, until the seventy-seventh minute when the Giants got a consolation try: a Warrington mistake saw Huddersfield get a set of six in the opposition half and after keeping the ball alive and sending it through the hands out to David Hodgson on the wing, he stepped outside one defender and inside the next before reaching an arm out of the third defender's tackle to bounce the ball off the try-line. The video referee was again called upon to award the try and Brett Hodgson's sideline conversion was successful, bringing the score to 24–16. With just over a minute remaining, Warrington were down close to Huddersfield's line when the ball went to Lee Briers who kicked a field goal, putting the final score at 25 - 16.

=== Details ===
29 August 2009
1433 BST

| Huddersfield Giants | 16–25 | Warrington Wolves |
|---|---|---|
| Tries: Shaun Lunt; Brett Hodgson; David Hodgson; Goals: Brett Hodgson (2) | Report | Tries: Richard Mathers; Michael Monaghan; Chris Hicks; Vinnie Anderson; Goals: Chris Bridge (4); Drops: Lee Briers |

Wembley Stadium
Attendance: 76,560
Referee: Steve Ganson
Player of the Match: Michael Monaghan, Warrington

Huddersfield Giants

2009 Challenge Cup teams
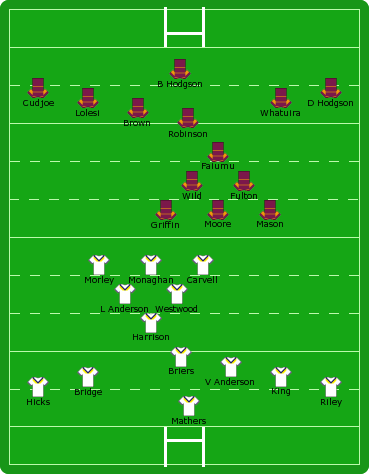

Warrington Wolves
PLAYERS
PLAYERS
FB
1
(Australia) Brett Hodgson (c)
37'
FB
30
(England) Richard Mathers
2'
WG
21
(England) Leroy Cudjoe

WG
19
(England) Chris Riley

CE
11
(New Zealand) Jamahl Lolesi

CE
4
(Australia) Matt King

CE
4
(New Zealand) Paul Whatuira

CE
25
(Republic of Ireland) Chris Bridge

WG
5
(England) David Hodgson
77'
WG
23
(Australia) Chris Hicks
15'
SO
3
(England) Kevin Brown

SO
13
(New Zealand) Vinnie Anderson
60'
SH
7
(England) Luke Robinson

SH
6
(Wales) Lee Briers

PR
16
(Wales) Keith Mason

PR
8
(England) Adrian Morley (c)

HK
20
(England) Scott Moore

HK
7
(Australia) Michael Monaghan
12'
PR
10
(England) Darrell Griffin

PR
16
(Wales) Garreth Carvell

SR
6
(Australia) Liam Fulton

SR
11
(New Zealand) Louis Anderson

SR
13
(England) Stephen Wild

SR
12
(England) Ben Westwood

LF
9
(New Zealand) David Faiumu

LF
24
(Republic of Ireland) Ben Harrison

Interchanges:
Interchanges:

8
(England) Eorl Crabtree

18
(England) Michael Cooper

15
(Scotland) Paul Jackson

2
(England) Paul Johnson

24
(England) Shaun Lunt
10'

14
(England) Mickey Higham

2
(England) Martin Aspinwall

28
(Republic of Ireland) Tyrone McCarthy

Coach:
(Australia) Nathan Brown
Coach:
(Australia) Tony Smith
MATCH RULES
- Twelve interchanges per team, from four players.
- In case of draw, match to be replayed at Reebok Stadium, Bolton on 8 September.
- Video referee present.

== Man of the Match ==
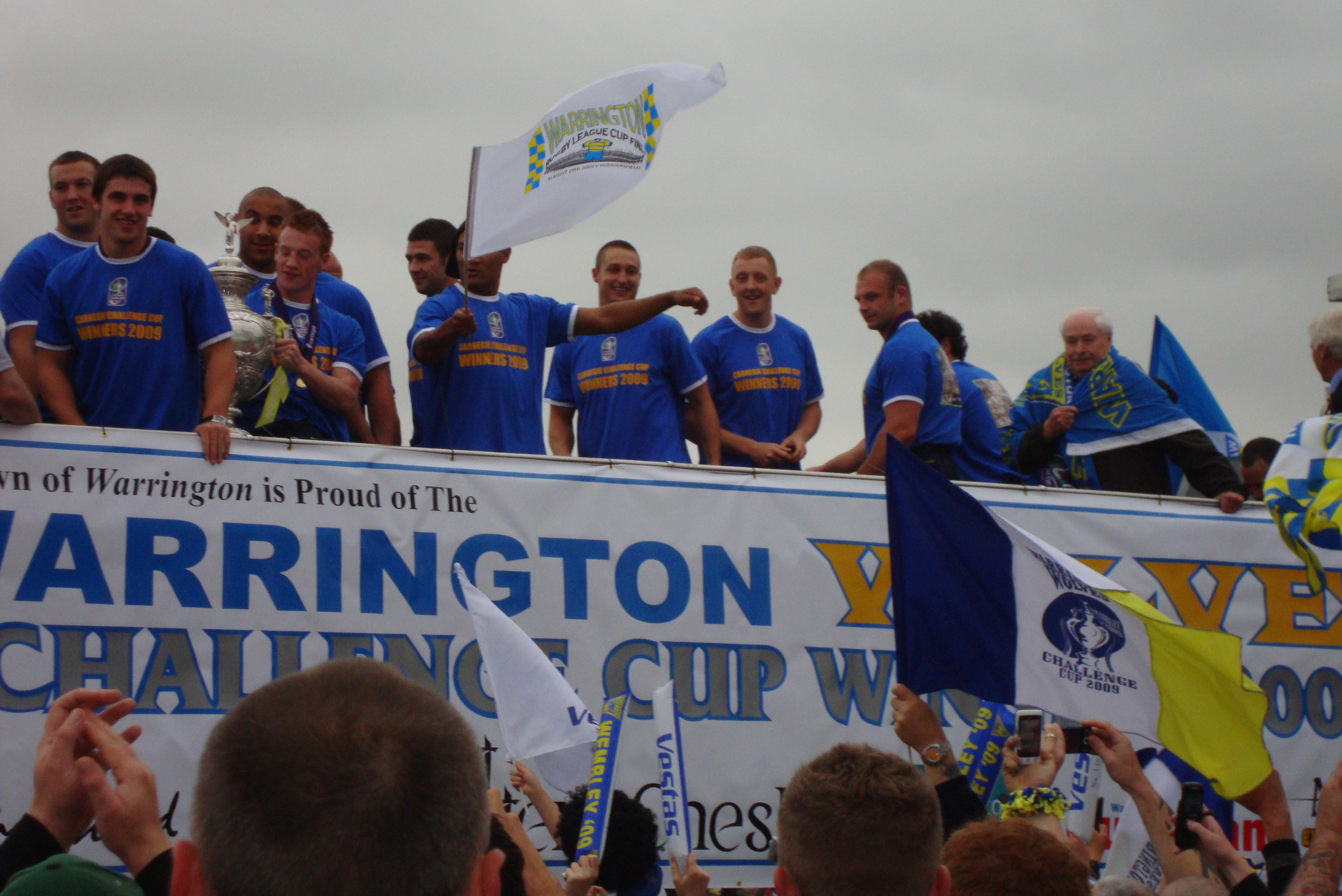
Warrington celebrating the Cup win.

The Lance Todd Trophy is awarded to the Man of the Match in each year's Challenge Cup final and this year Michael Monaghan became the third Australian in history to win it.

== See also ==
- Challenge Cup
