= 2011 Challenge Cup final =

Rugby league match in the United Kingdom

2011 Challenge Cup Final
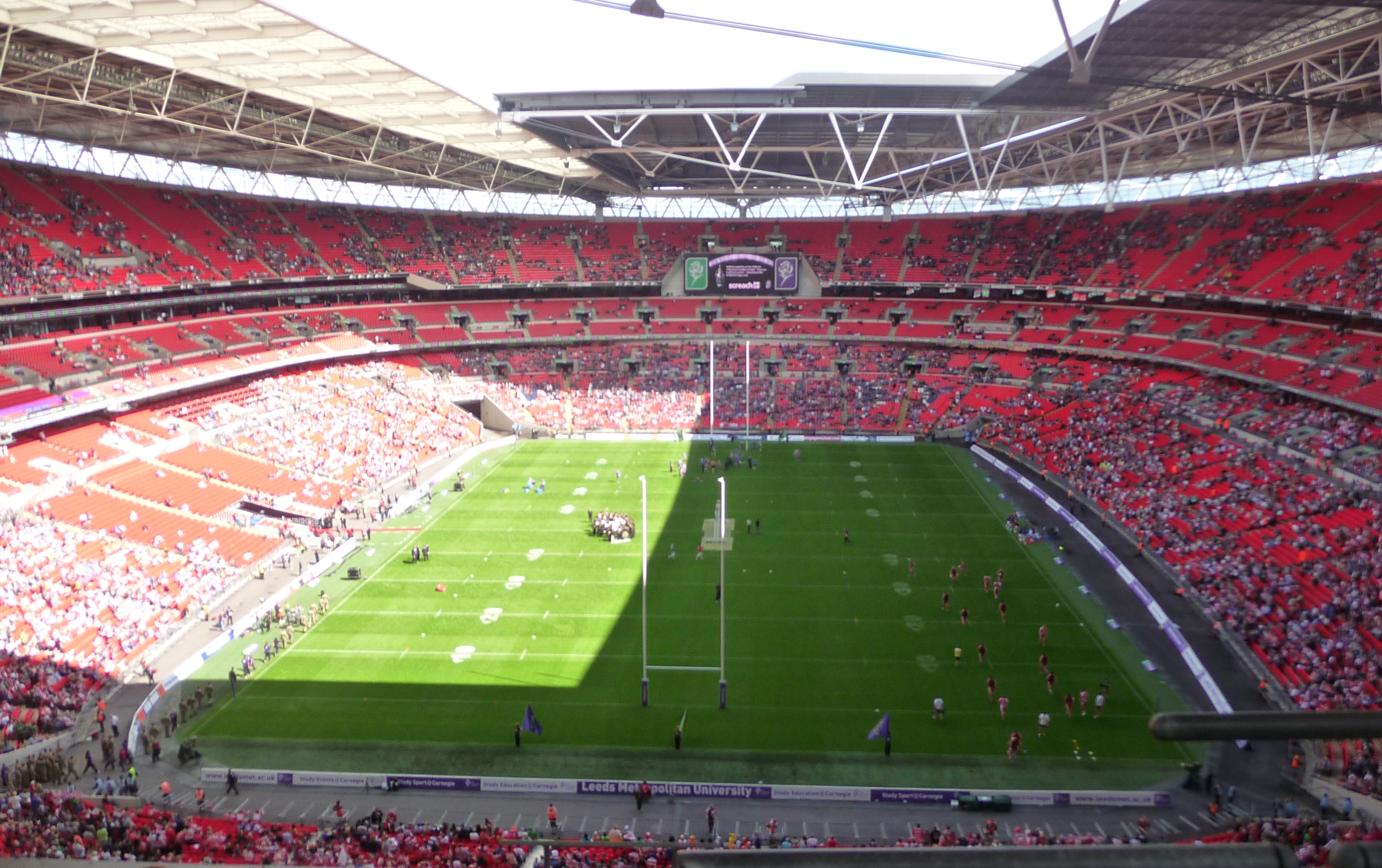
- Teams warming up before the match
Leeds Rhinos	Wigan Warriors
18	28
	1	2	Total
LEE	10	8	18
WIG	16	12	28
- Date: 27 August 2011
- Stadium: Wembley Stadium, London
- Location: London, United Kingdom
- Lance Todd Trophy: Jeff Lima
- God Save The Queen and Abide with Me: Rhydian Roberts
- Referee: Phil Bentham
- Attendance: 78,482

Broadcast partners
- Broadcasters: BBC One

The 2011 Challenge Cup Final was the 110th cup-deciding game of the rugby league 2011 Challenge Cup Season. It was held at Wembley Stadium in London on 27 August 2011, kick off 14:30. The final was contested by the Leeds Rhinos and the Wigan Warriors. The game saw Wigan beat Leeds by 28 points to 18.

== Route to the final ==
=== Leeds Rhinos ===
Leeds Rhinos drew Celtic Crusaders in the fourth round, beating the soon to be relegated side 30 points to 20. A fifth round victory over relegation survivors Harlequins, winning by double the point, saw progression to the quarter finals where a comfortable away win against Hull F.C. booked the Rhinos a place in the smi-finals. Lewis's final game before the final saw an extra time win over Castleford Tigers following an eight all draw after the full eighty.

Round	Opposition	Score
4th	Celtic Crusaders (H)	30–20
5th	Harlequins RL (H)	40–20
QF	Hull F.C. (A)	38–22
SF	Castleford Tigers (N)	10–8 (aet)

=== Wigan Warriors ===
Wigan Warriors drew eventual Championship relegation side Barrow Raiders in the fourth round, trashing them 52 nill. A tight 26–22 over Bradford Bulls saw the Warriors progress to the quarter finals, where they beat eventual Super League league leaders Warrington Wolves 44 to 24 thus progressing to the semis. The semi-finals saw a Good Friday derby victory over St Helens, beating them 18–12 to book their place in the final.

Round	Opposition	Score
4th	Barrow Raiders (A)	52–0
5th	Bradford Bulls (H)	26–22
QF	Warrington Wolves (A)	44–24
SF	St Helens (N)	18–12

== Background and Pre-match ==
The two sides with the most Challenge Cup Final appearances had only met twice before, Wigan winning both times (1994 and 1995). Leeds had played in the previous year's Challenge Cup final loss, but it was the Wigan's Warriors' first visit to the new Wembley Stadium. Abide with me was sung by Rhydian Roberts.

The game was broadcast by BBC with John Kear and Dave Woods commentating, as well as additional commentary from Tanya Arnold, Clare Balding, Jonathan Davies, Robbie Hunter-Paul, Justin Morgan and Brian Noble. The national anthem of England was then sung before referee Phil Bentham, overseeing his first Challenge Cup final, blew time on and Leeds' captain Kevin Sinfield kicked off.

== Match details ==
27 August
14:30

Leeds Rhinos
Tries
Ryan Hall (2)
Ben Jones-Bishop
Carl Ablett

Goals
Kevin Sinfield

18–28
Report

Wigan Warriors
Tries
Jeff Lima (2)
Josh Charnley
Joel Tomkins
Thomas Leuluai

Goals
Pat Richards (4)

Wembley Stadium, London (England)
Attendance: 78,482
Referee: Phil Bentham (England)
Player of the Match: Jeff Lima (New Zealand)

Leeds Rhinos	Posit.	Wigan Warriors
1 Brent Webb	FB	1 Sam Tomkins
23 Ben Jones-Bishop	WG	25 Josh Charnley
19 Kallum Watkins	CE	12 Joel Tomkins
12 Carl Ablett	CE	4 George Carmont
5 Ryan Hall	WG	5 Pat Richards
13 Kevin Sinfield (c)	SO	6 Paul Deacon
6 Danny McGuire	SH	17 Brett Finch
8 Kylie Leuluai	PR	10 Andy Coley
9 Danny Buderus	HK	7 Thomas Leuluai
10 Jamie Peacock	PR	15 Jeff Lima
11 Jamie Jones-Buchanan	SR	11 Harrison Hansen
3 Brett Delaney	SR	16 Ryan Hoffman
20 Weller Hauraki	LF	13 Sean O'Loughlin (c)
7 Rob Burrow	Int.	9 Michael McIlorum
16 Ryan Bailey	Int.	14 Paul Prescott
17 Ian Kirke	Int.	21 Lee Mossop
21 Chris Clarkson	Int.	22 Liam Farrell
Brian McDermott	Coach	Michael Maguire

=== First half ===
The first points of the match came in the ninth minute when Wigan, having made their way into Leeds' half of the field, moved the ball through the hands to the right winger Josh Charnley, who side-stepped the defence and crashed over the line. Pat Richards missed the attempted conversion so the score remained 0-4 in favour of the Warriors. Wigan were again attacking from fifteen metres out when their prop Jeff Lima ran onto Paul Prescott's short pass, and into a defensive gap to dive over near the goal posts just before the twenty-four-minute mark. Richards' conversion was successful so Wigan were leading 0-10. In the twenty-eighth minute, Warriors fullback Sam Tomkins was returning the Leeds' kick from within his own ten metres, running across-field before passing the ball out to his brother, right centre Joel Tomkins. Racing down the sideline, he palmed off one defender and had run seventy metres before he stepped back inside and in between the converging Rhinos defenders, continuing on straight to the centre of the goal-line to dive over under the posts for what was described as one of the great Wembley tries. Richards put the kick over so Wigan were in front 0-16.

It took until the thirty-fifth minute for Leeds to get on the scoreboard when, having worked the ball up to within the opposition ten-metre line, they kept the ball alive, moving it quickly though the hands out to left winger Ryan Hall who dived over untouched in the corner. Sinfield's difficult conversion attempt rebounded against the goal post back into the field so Wigan's lead remained 4-16. Only two minutes later, Leeds had made their way back into opposition territory, again keeping the ball alive with deft passing, this time getting it out to right winger Ben Jones-Bishop who barged his way over the try-line to score. Sinfield kicked the conversion successfully, bringing the half-time score to 10-16 in the Warriors' favour.

=== Second half ===
The first eighteen minutes of the second half saw a tight arm-wrestle between the two sides. Then Leeds, having won a scrum from Wigan's error inside their own ten-metre line, moved the ball right to centre Carl Ablett who muscled his way through the defence and onto the try-line. The video referee, Steve Ganson gave the try and Sinfield's goal-kick was wide, leaving the Rhinos trailing the Warriors 14-16. Wigan, having advanced into an attacking position, scored again when Lee Mossop's controversial-looking short pass to Jeff Lima sent the prop forward again crashing over the try line beside the uprights just before the sixty-two-minute mark. Richards converted the try for Wigan to lead 14-22.

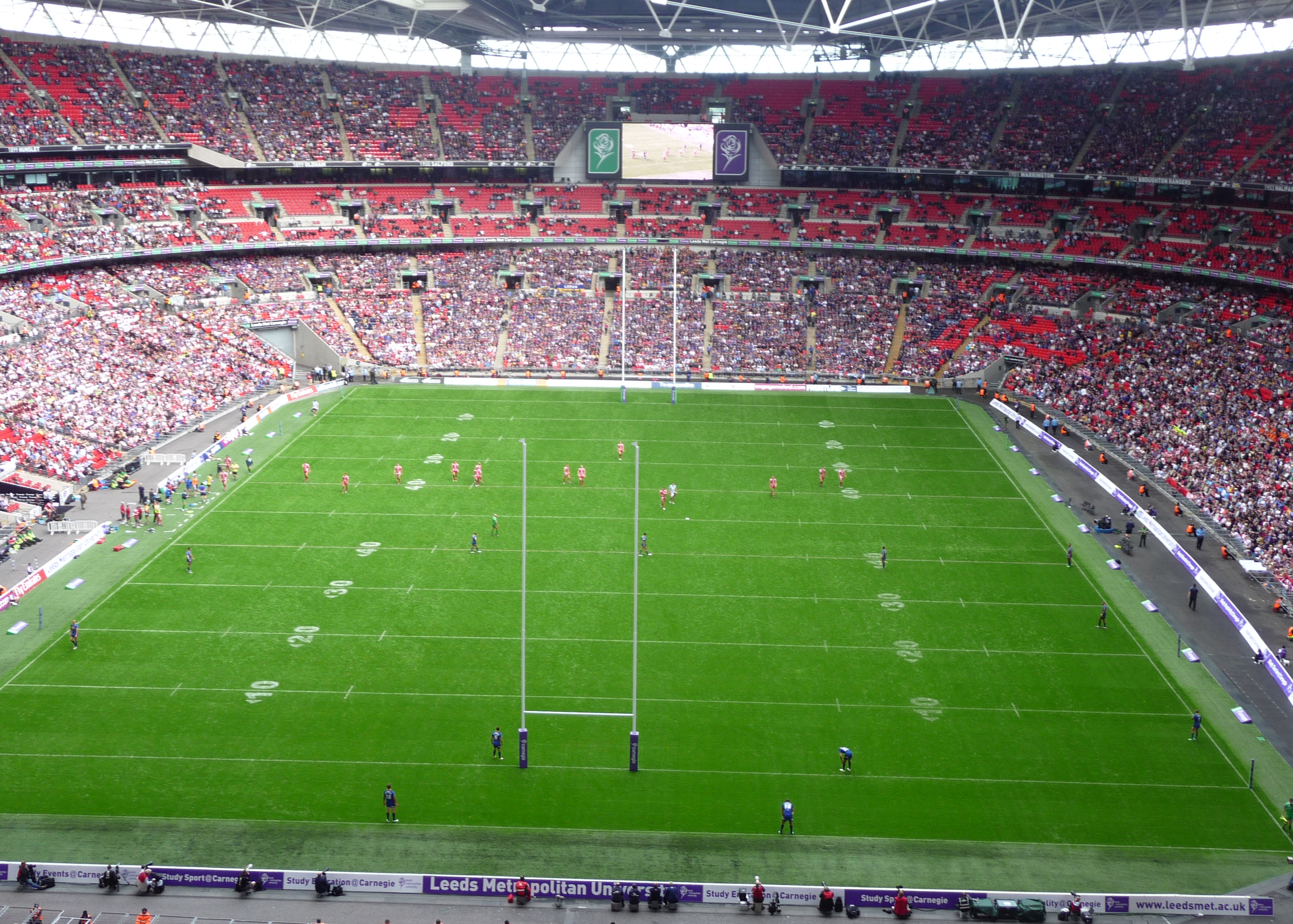
During the match at Wembley Stadium

With nine minutes of the match remaining, Leeds were down at the opposition's end and on the fifth tackle moved the ball through the hands out to their left winger, Ryan Hall to barge through the defence and over the try-line. Sinfield couldn't kick the sideline conversion so Leeds trailed 18-22. After receiving the kick-off, the Rhinos made a good break through right winger Ben Jones-Bishop, who kicked the ball ahead into the in-goal area where neither of the Leeds or Wigan chasers racing though could secure it. With less than two and a half minutes remaining, the Warriors were on Leeds' ten-metre line when dummy-half Tommy Leuluai ran through some tired marker defence to get over the line. The video referee was called upon to rule that the ball was not lost in the attempted grounding and the try was awarded. Richards converted successfully so the match ended in a Wigan 18-28 victory.

== Post-match ==
The Wigan Warriors had won the Challenge Cup for a record eighteenth time. The Lance Todd Trophy for man-of-the-match was awarded to Wigan prop forward Jeff Lima, who had scored two tries, becoming the fifth New Zealander (and first prop forward since 1980) to win the award. Later, the Rugby Football League found Wigan fullback Sam Tomkins guilty of minor misconduct for an abusive gesture to Leeds fans during the match and fined him £1,000.
