= Jeff Lima (rugby league) =

NZ & Samoa international rugby league footballer

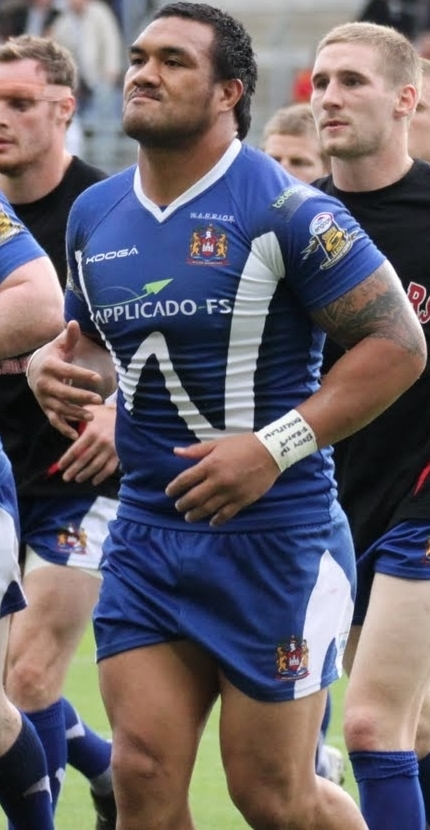

Personal information
- Born: 4 July 1982 (age 44) Auckland, New Zealand

Playing information
- Height: 182 cm (6 ft 0 in)
- Weight: 113 kg (17 st 11 lb)
- Position: Prop
Club
Years	Team	Pld	T	G	FG	P
2004–05	Wests Tigers	2	1	0	0	4
2006–10	Melbourne Storm	95	9	1	0	38
2011–12	Wigan Warriors	61	6	0	0	24
2013	South Sydney	20	1	0	0	4
2014–15	Catalans Dragons	46	3	1	0	14
2016–17	Canberra Raiders	9	0	0	0	0
	Total	233	20	2	0	84
Representative
Years	Team	Pld	T	G	FG	P
2006–13	Samoa	2	1	0	0	4
2007–09	New Zealand	6	0	0	0	0
2012	Exiles	1	0	0	0	0

Jeff Lima (born 4 July 1982) is a former professional rugby league footballer who last played for the Canberra Raiders in the NRL. A New Zealand international representative prop, he previously played for the Wests Tigers, Melbourne Storm, South Sydney Rabbitohs, Wigan Warriors and the Catalans Dragons in the Super League, as well as France's Elite One Championship for the Saint-Gaudens Bears.

== Background ==
Lima was born in Auckland, New Zealand.

Went to De La Salle College, Mangere, New Zealand

== Biography ==
Of Samoan heritage, Lima was educated at Auckland's De La Salle College, Mangere East. His junior club was the Mangere East Hawks. Lima moved to Sydney, where he attended Patrician Brothers' College Blacktown.

=== Professional playing career ===
==== Wests Tigers ====
Lima made his début in the National Rugby League with Sydney's Wests Tigers club, scoring a try as the team defeated the Manly-Warringah Sea Eagles. In the next round, he was again chosen to play from the bench, but it was to be his last first-grade appearance for the club.

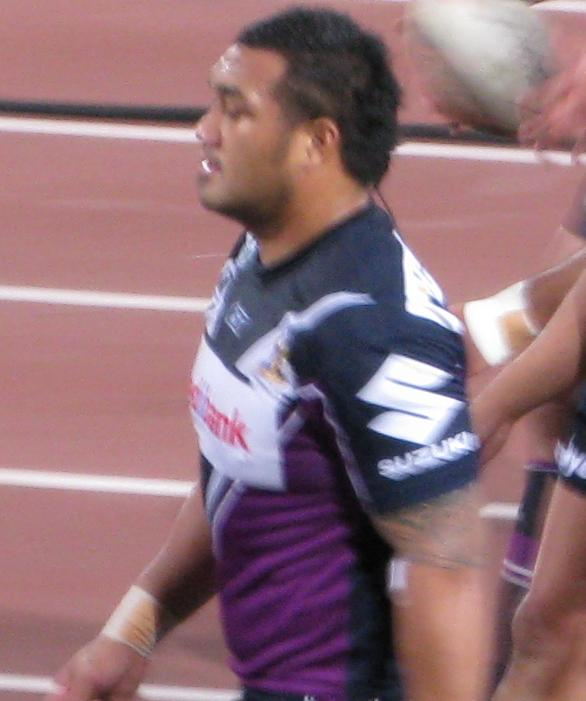
Lima while playing for Melbourne in 2008

==== Melbourne Storm ====
Lima was rewarded for his good form throughout the 2007 NRL season's finals with selection on the interchange bench for the Storm's victory in the 2007 NRL grand final as well as the New Zealand national side to play Australia on 14 October.

In August 2008, Lima was named in the New Zealand training squad for the 2008 Rugby League World Cup, and in October 2008, he was named in the final 24-man Kiwi squad.

Lima played at prop in the Storm's loss in the 2008 NRL grand final. He was then forced to withdraw from New Zealand's squad for the 2008 Rugby League World Cup through injury.

Lima played from the interchange bench in the Storm's 2009 NRL grand final victory over Parramatta. He then played at prop for Melbourne's victory over Super League champions Leeds Rhinos in the 2010 World Club Challenge. However, months later, these and all previous honours achieved by the Melbourne club during Lima's time there were stripped by the NRL when long-term systematic breaches of the salary cap at the club were uncovered. Lima and his teammates were also prevented from playing for premiership points in the 2010 NRL season as the club tried to offload players to bring them within the salary cap. In July 2010, Lima signed with English Super League club Wigan Warriors.

==== Wigan Warriors ====
He played as a prop forward in the 2011 Challenge Cup Final victory over the Leeds Rhinos at Wembley Stadium. He scored two tries and became the fifth ever New Zealander, and first prop forward since 1980 to win the Lance Todd Trophy as man-of-the-match.

On 25 May 2012, Lima agreed to terms for re-joining his Wigan coach Michael Maguire in the National Rugby League with the South Sydney Rabbitohs for the 2013 and 2014 seasons.

==== South Sydney Rabbitohs ====
Lima played at prop forward for the Samoa national rugby league team in their 2013 one-off test match loss against Tonga.

==== Catalans Dragons ====
In 2014, Lima returned to the Super League, joining French side Catalans Dragons. He played 39 games and scored 1 try.

==== Canberra Raiders ====
In October 2015, it was revealed that Lima would be joining the Canberra Raiders on a two-year contract starting in 2016. In September 2017, Lima announced his retirement from rugby league with his final game being for the Mount Pritchard Mounties in the Intrust Super Premiership NSW elimination final against Illawarra.
