= Michael Maguire (rugby league) =

Australian former rugby league footballer and coach

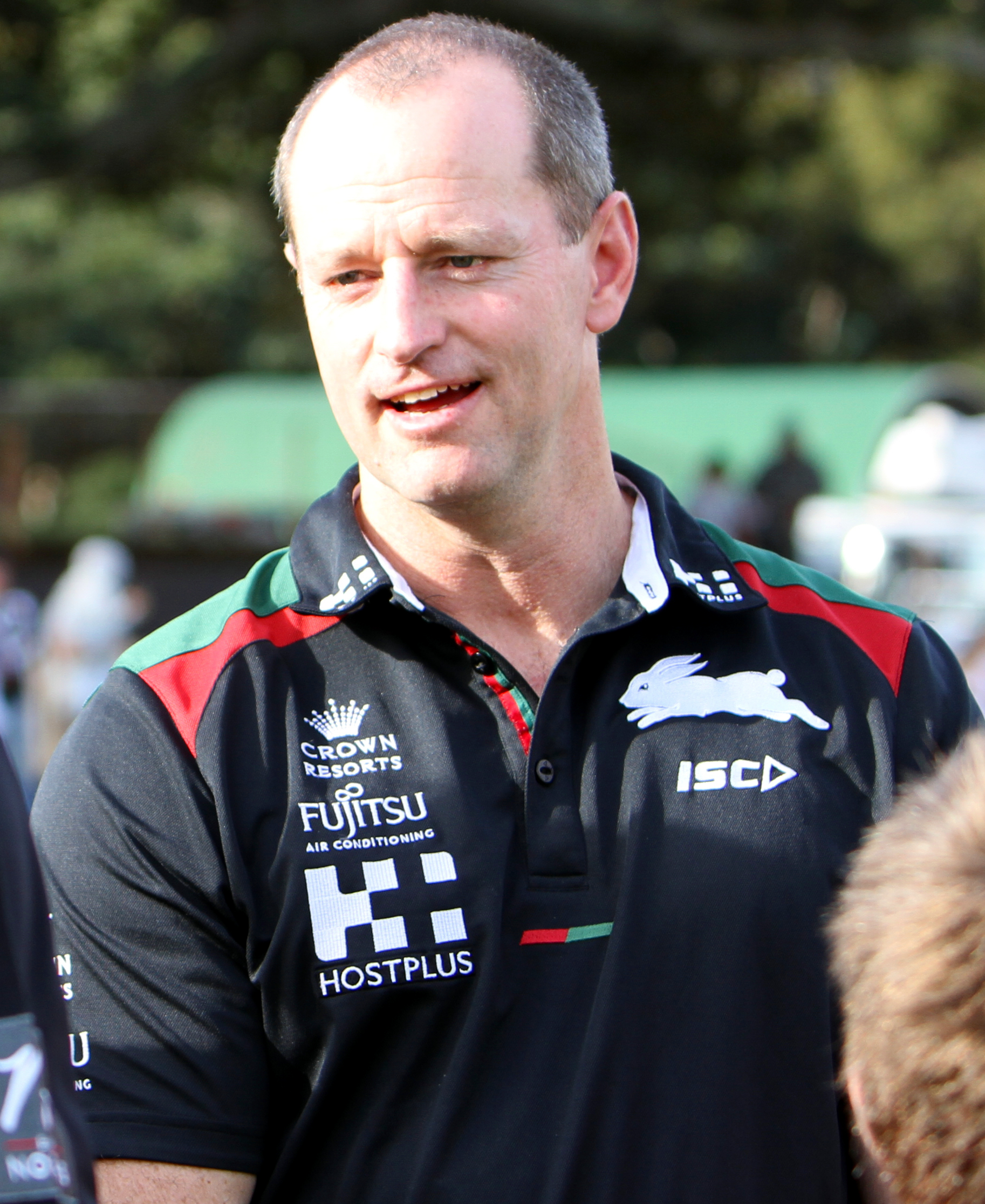

Personal information
- Full name: Michael Maguire
- Born: 5 February 1974 (age 52) Canberra, Australian Capital Territory, Australia

Playing information
- Position: Fullback, Wing, Centre
Club
Years	Team	Pld	T	G	FG	P
1992–96	Canberra Raiders	11	4	0	0	16
1997	Adelaide Rams	5	1	0	0	4
1998	Canberra Raiders	2	1	0	0	4
	Total	18	6	0	0	24

Coaching information
Club
Years	Team	Gms	W	D	L	W%
2010–11	Wigan Warriors	70	53	3	14	76
2012–17	South Sydney	153	85	0	68	56
2019–22	Wests Tigers	80	29	0	51	36
2025–	Brisbane Broncos	50	25	0	25	50
	Total	353	192	3	158	54
Representative
Years	Team	Gms	W	D	L	W%
2018–23	New Zealand	18	12	0	6	67
2024	New South Wales	3	2	0	1	67
- Source: As of 21 November 2026

Michael "Madge" Maguire (born 5 February 1974) is an Australian professional rugby league football coach who is the head coach of the Brisbane Broncos in the National Rugby League, whom he coached to victory in the 2025 NRL Grand Final. Previously, he coached New South Wales and New Zealand at international level. He is also a former professional rugby league footballer who played as a fullback, winger and centre in the 1990s.

After a playing career spent mostly at the Canberra Raiders, with a brief stint with the Adelaide Rams, he became assistant coach of Melbourne Storm under Craig Bellamy and in 2009 became a head coach in the Super League with English club the Wigan Warriors. He was previously the head coach for the South Sydney Rabbitohs and the Wests Tigers in the NRL.

In his first year as Wigan Warriors' coach Maguire won the 2010 Super League Grand Final. In his second year he won the 2011 Challenge Cup and was then signed by the Rabbitohs. In his first year as an NRL head coach he took South Sydney deep into the 2012 finals series. In 2013, Souths finished the regular season in second place and in 2014 they won their first premiership in 43 years.

== Background ==
Maguire was born in Canberra, Australian Capital Territory, Australia. He attended St Edmund's College.

== Playing career ==
After initially starting playing in rugby union, Maquire signed for NSWRL club the Canberra Raiders in 1991 and made his Winfield Cup début for the club off the bench against Manly-Warringah Sea Eagles in a narrow 14–15 loss.

Maguire did not feature again until 1994 when he came off the bench again against Penrith Panthers. He had a more consistent season the following year, making six appearances in total, most of which he started as either wing or centre. Maguire's first try came as a centre against the Parramatta Eels.

In 1997 Maguire left Canberra and signed for the new Adelaide Rams club in the breakaway Australian Super League competition. He made his début at fullback in the Rams inaugural game against the North Queensland Cowboys in Townsville which Adelaide lost 24–16. Maguire also participated in the World Club Challenge for the Rams that year. He went on to play four more games for Adelaide and scored one try before returning to Canberra in 1998. Maguire made two appearances for Canberra in 1998 before retiring after persistent neck problems.

== Coaching career ==
When Maguire retired from playing he initially left the game and taught physical education before signing as a strength and conditioning coach for Canberra. He later became an assistant coach for the Raiders' reserve grade under Mal Meninga. Maguire was eventually promoted to assistant coach of the Canberra first team alongside Matthew Elliott, before leaving the club in 2004 to take the assistant coaching job at Melbourne Storm under a former Raiders teammate, Craig Bellamy.

Maguire was an integral part in Melbourne's stripped NRL premierships and took control of first team affairs when head coach Bellamy took up representative duties for the Blues in State of Origin. This earned him plaudits from senior coaches in the NRL and Maguire was linked with a move to Brisbane Broncos as head coach in 2008. He was heavily linked with a move to English club Wigan Warriors towards the end of the 2009 season and signed a three-year deal with the Super League side on 7 October 2009.

=== Wigan Warriors ===
Maguire started his Wigan coaching career with a victory against the Crusaders in his first home match of the season. He ended the Halliwell Jones hoodoo (Wigan hadn't won a competitive game away at Wire since they last played at Wilderspool) against Warrington in a thrilling match which Wigan won 22–20. He won RLW coach of the month for February. Maguire then recorded his biggest victory as a Wigan coach, beating nearest rivals St. Helens in the last ever Good Friday derby match at Knowsley Road. He and his assistant Shaun Wane helped guide Wigan to the League Leaders' Shield in 2010. This was the first time Wigan topped the table in 10 years and marked a trophy winning start to "Madge's" Wigan coaching tenure. Maguire guided Wigan to their first Super League Grand Final appearance in seven years as the Wigan club beat Leeds in a semi-final at Headingley by a scoreline of 26–6 on 25 September 2010. Maguire was crowned Coach of the Year 2010 at the annual Super League 'Man of Steel' awards dinner.

Maguire managed the Wigan side to their first Super League Grand Final win in over 10 years beating their arch rivals in the 2010 Super League Grand Final victory over St. Helens at Old Trafford.

The following February his Wigan side took on 2010 NRL premiers St. George Illawarra Dragons in the 2011 World Club Challenge but were defeated. In 2011 Maguire announced his resignation from Wigan, in order to replace the retiring John Lang as head coach of National Rugby League club the South Sydney Rabbitohs for the 2012 NRL season.

Maguire coached Wigan to the 2011 Challenge Cup Final victory over the Leeds Rhinos at Wembley Stadium.

=== South Sydney Rabbitohs ===
Maguire joined the South Sydney Rabbitohs in October 2011, after the end of the NRL and Super League seasons. He had signed a contract with the club earlier in the year, to replace the retiring John Lang. The Rabbitohs performed well during the 2012 NRL season with Maguire credited for the successful move of Greg Inglis from centre to full-back. The team progressed to within one game of the 2012 NRL Grand Final. The following year, Maguire guided Souths to within one game of the 2013 NRL Grand Final but the club were defeated 30–20 by Manly-Warringah in the preliminary final.

In the 2014 NRL season, Souths were tipped to be winners of the minor premiership, along with the Sydney Roosters and Manly-Warringah Sea Eagles. The first finals round saw Souths defeat Manly, then facing the Roosters in the preliminary final. Unlike the last round of the ordinary season, Souths overcome an early 12–0 deficit to score 32 unanswered points, eventually winning the match 32–22. Under Maguire's coaching this was the first time since 1971 that South Sydney had reached a grand final. Souths defeated the Canterbury-Bankstown Bulldogs 30–6 in the 2014 NRL Grand Final, securing their 21st premiership and their first since 1971. In September 2017, Maguire was terminated as coach of South Sydney despite having two years remaining on his contract.

=== Wests Tigers ===
On 28 October 2018, Maguire was announced as Head coach of Wests Tigers for the next three years. In his first year in charge of the Wests Tigers, Maguire guided the club to a ninth-place finish narrowly missing out on the finals.

In round 4 of the 2020 NRL season, Wests lost 28–23 to the struggling Gold Coast side giving them their first win in 364 days. In the post match press conference, Maguire spoke to the media saying “I'm sick and tired of the ups and downs of the performances. We need to change that. That's what this club has been, I didn't want to say that, but it's the truth. and the truth is we need to fix how we do things when we are performing".

During the half-time interval in round 12 of the 2020 NRL season, Maguire was seen on a dressing room camera berating his players for their poor first half performance against the New Zealand Warriors. Maguire was then seen kicking a chair across the room.

At the end of his second year in charge of the Wests Tigers, the club finished a disappointing 11th on the table and missed out on the finals. Wests were also one of only five teams to concede over 500 points in the 2020 NRL season.

In the 2021 NRL season, Maguire guided the Wests Tigers to a disappointing 13th placed finish on the table including a 38–0 loss against Wooden Spoon side Canterbury in the last round. After the season had concluded, Maguire's position as head coach came under intense scrutiny but on 21 September 2021, the Wests Tigers board declared that Maguire would continue as head coach in 2022.

On 6 June 2022, Wests Tigers announced Maguire had been terminated as head coach with the club sitting 13th on the table. He was replaced by interim coach Brett Kimmorley.

=== New Zealand ===
In 2018, Maguire became head coach of the New Zealand national rugby league team. Maguire took New Zealand to the semi-final of the 2021 Rugby League World Cup where they lost against Australia. On 4 November 2023, Maguire coached New Zealand to the Pacific Championships trophy upsetting Australia 30–0 in the final. New Zealand had won just one game against the Kangaroos in the previous nine outings, with a run of three-straight losses including an 18-point drubbing just a week earlier. In December 2023, Maguire signed a contract to become New South Wales head coach starting in 2024. It was reported that Maguire had been given an ultimatum by the New Zealand rugby league board to either stay solely with them or his contract would be terminated.

=== New South Wales ===
In November 2023, Maguire was appointed coach of New South Wales. There was much optimism heading into the first match of the series but this changed when Joseph Sua'ali'i was sent off in the 8th minute for a high tackle on Reece Walsh. New South Wales lost 38–10, recording their biggest defeat in Sydney. In the aftermath, some of Maguire's decisions came under fire, particularly his decision to limit play time of captain Jake Trbojevic. New South Wales would go on to win game two of the series in emphatic fashion defeating Queensland 38–18 at the Melbourne Cricket Ground, leading 34–0 at half time in a dominant display. In game three, Maguire guided New South Wales to a 14–4 victory over Queensland to win the series. It was the first time since 2005 that a New South Wales team had won a deciding game in Brisbane and Maguire was praised for his tactics, leading to immediate speculation he would return to full-time NRL coaching if given the opportunity.

=== Brisbane Broncos ===
On 1 October 2024, Maguire was appointed coach of the Brisbane Broncos. on a three year contract ending in 2027. The Brisbane club finished first in the 2025 NRL Pre-season Challenge played in February, prior to the commencement of the regular 2025 NRL season in March.

At the end of the 2025 NRL season, the Brisbane side secured fourth place on the ladder after defeating the Melbourne 30–14 in Round 27 at Suncorp Stadium.

Maguire completed one of the great rugby league coaching journeys when he led the Brisbane Broncos to a dramatic 26–22 victory over Melbourne in the 2025 NRL Grand Final, ending the club's 19-year premiership drought.

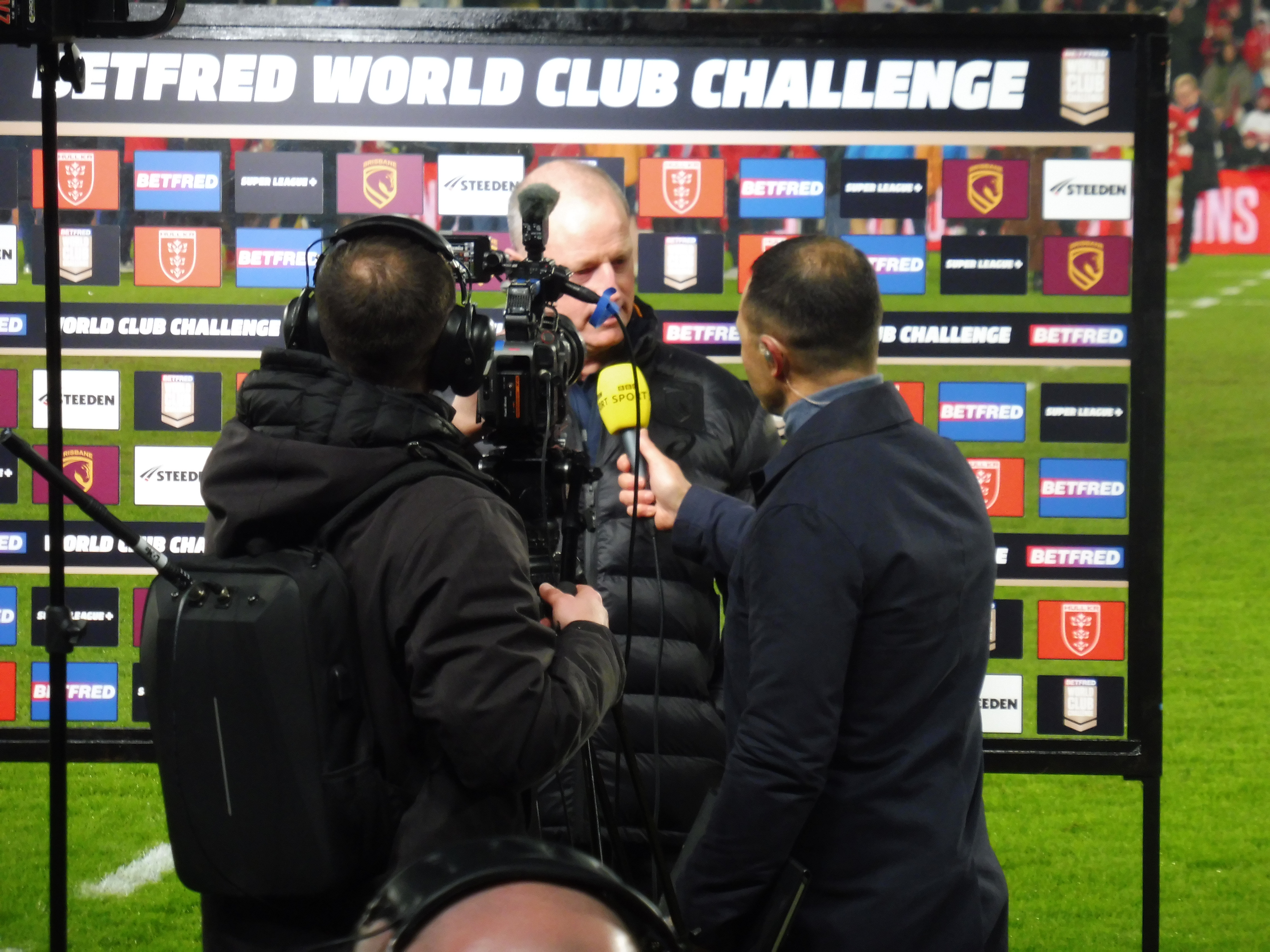
Maguire being interviewed following Brisbane's World Club Challenge loss in February 2026

On 19 February 2026, he coached Brisbane in their World Club Challenge loss against Hull Kingston Rovers. In the 2026 NRL season, Brisbane had one of the worst title defences in modern history under Maguire as the club slumped to a 14th placed finish on the table. At one point in the year, the club lost eight consecutive matches.

== Honours ==
Individual

- Super League Coach Of The Year: 2010
- RLIF Coach Of The Year: 2014

Club

- Super League League Leaders' Shield: 2010
- Super League Grand Finalist: 2010
- Super League Premier: 2010
- Super League Challenge Cup Finalist: 2011
- Super League Challenge Cup Winner: 2011
- NRL Grand Finalist: 2014, 2025
- NRL Premier: 2014, 2025
- World Club Challenge Winner: 2015
- NRL Nines Winner: 2015
- NRL Pre-Season Challenge Winner: 2025

Representative

- Baskerville Shield Winner: 2019
- Pacific Championship Winner: 2023
- State Of Origin Series Winner: 2024
