= Michael McIlorum =

England and Ireland international rugby league footballer

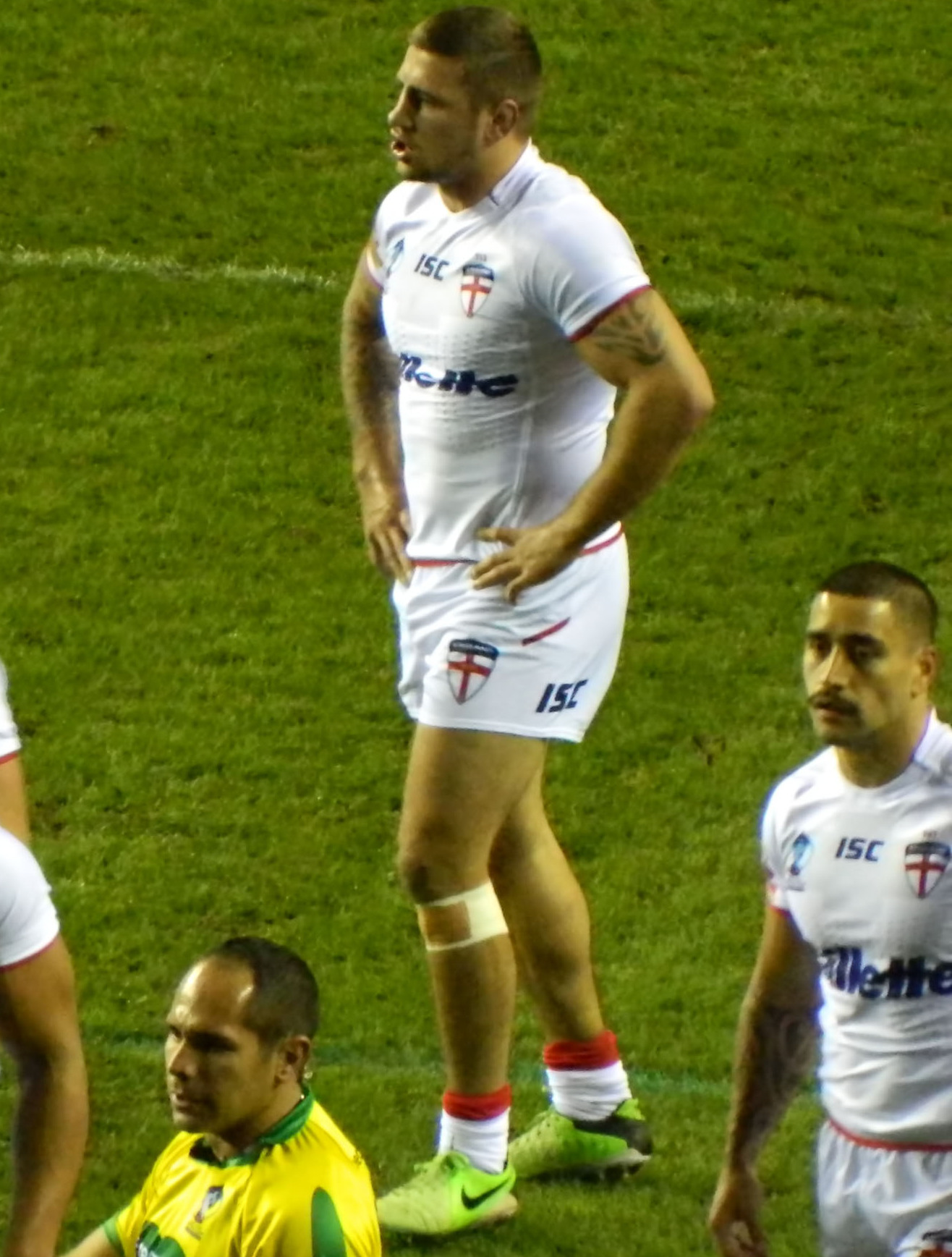

Personal information
- Born: 10 January 1988 (age 38) Leeds, West Yorkshire, England

Playing information
- Height: 5 ft 8 in (1.73 m)
- Weight: 13 st 12 lb (88 kg)
- Position: Hooker
Club
Years	Team	Pld	T	G	FG	P
2007–17	Wigan Warriors	242	24	0	0	96
2018–24	Catalans Dragons	130	10	0	0	32
2025	Hull Kingston Rovers	16	0	0	0	0
	Total	388	34	0	0	128
Representative
Years	Team	Pld	T	G	FG	P
2008–17	Ireland	6	1	0	0	4
2011–22	England	9	0	0	0	0

Michael McIlorum (born 10 January 1988) is a former professional rugby league footballer who last played as a hooker for Hull Kingston Rovers in the Super League. He was both an Ireland and England international.

He had played his entire professional career with the Wigan Warriors in the Super League, prior to his move to the South of France. He won the 2010 and 2013 Super League Championships with Wigan.

== Background ==
McIlorum was born 10 January 1988 in Leeds, West Yorkshire, England, and attended Farnley Park High School.

He was a Leeds amateur at Stanningley and Queens. He had been selected for England U16s in 2004 and joined Wigan's under-18s Academy in 2005.

== Playing career ==
=== Wigan ===
McIlorum signed a two-year full-time contract with Wigan in July 2005, keeping him at the club until the end of 2007. McIlorum was selected for Yorkshire U17s after joining Wigan in August 2005. He was also included in the England U17s squad to take on the touring Australian Institute of Sport in 2005. He capped the 2005 season by winning the Wigan Supporters' Association Under 18s Player of the Season award.

McIlorum made his senior début for Wigan on 8 June 2007 in a Challenge Cup quarter final tie against Harlequins RL at the JJB Stadium after an injury ruled out first team regular Shane Millard.

In 2010 Wigan made the 2010 Super League Grand Final, and McIlorum was selected to play as a hooker in the victory over St. Helens at Old Trafford.

The following year McIlorum played for Wigan from the substitutes' bench in the 2011 Challenge Cup Final victory over the Leeds Rhinos at Wembley Stadium.

He played in the 2013 Challenge Cup Final victory over Hull F.C. at Wembley Stadium.

Wigan reached the 2013 Super League Grand Final, and McIlorum was selected to play at hooker, scoring a try in their victory against the Warrington club at Old Trafford.

He played in the 2015 Super League Grand Final defeat by the Leeds side at Old Trafford.

In the 2016 World Club Series against Brisbane, McIlorum suffered a serious ankle injury, and did not play again for the rest of the 2016 season.

He played in the 2017 Challenge Cup Final defeat by Hull F.C. at Wembley Stadium.

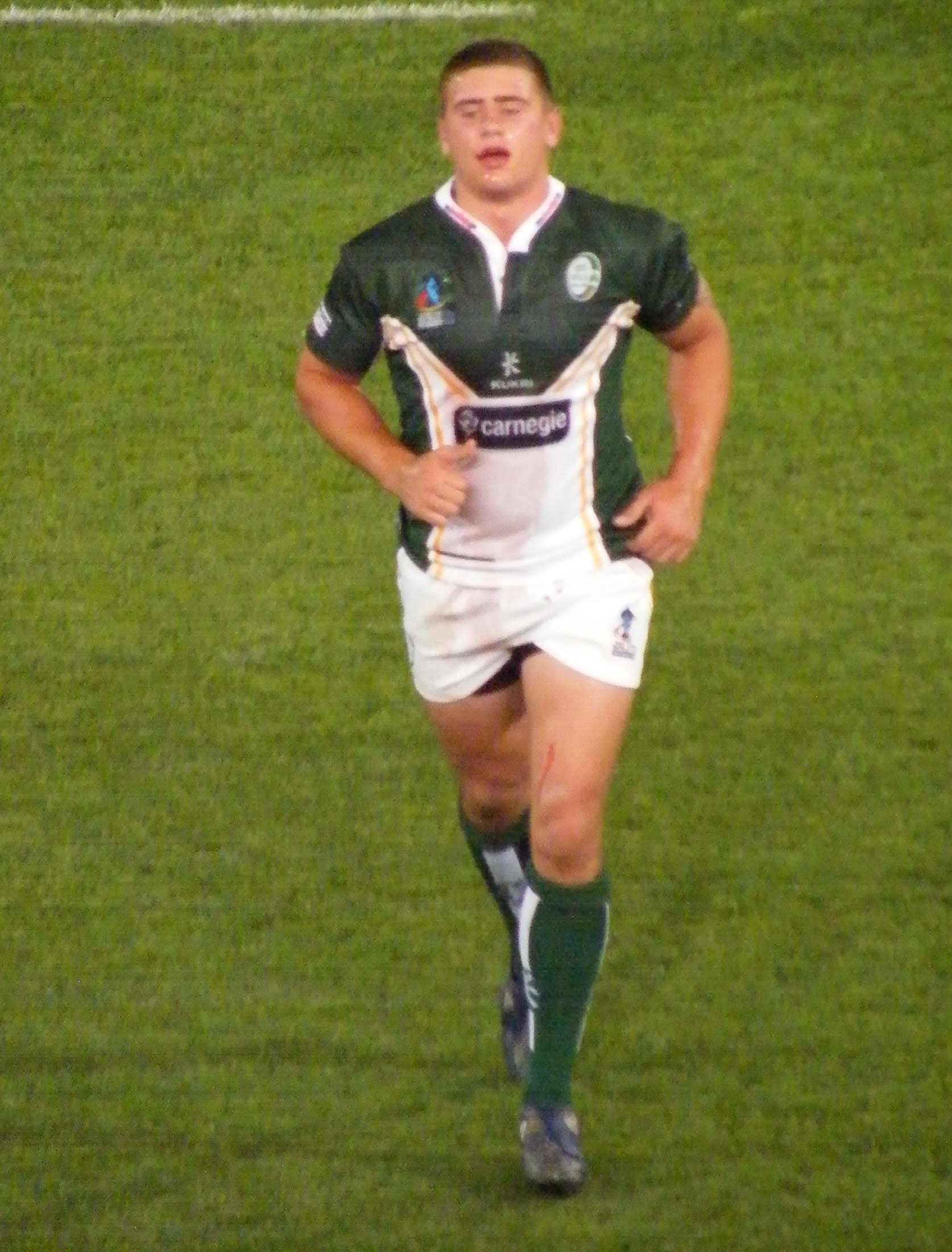
McIlorum playing for Ireland

=== Catalans Dragons ===
In January 2018, McIlorum signed a two-year deal with the Catalans Dragons.

He played in the 2018 Challenge Cup Final victory over the Warrington club at Wembley Stadium.

In the 2020 season, he played in the club's elimination final victory over Leeds but was placed on report during the game. He was later suspended for six matches after pleading guilty to two charges of a dangerous high tackle and other contrary conduct.

On 9 October 2021, he played for Catalans in their 2021 Super League Grand Final defeat against St. Helens. On 14 October 2023, McIlorum played in Catalans 2023 Super League Grand Final loss against Wigan.

On 25 September 2025, it was announced that McIlorum would return to the Dragons as an assistant Coach, alongside former teammate Mitchell Pierce.

=== Hull Kingston Rovers ===
On 18 July 2024 it was reported that he had signed for Hull Kingston Rovers in the Super League on a one-year deal. On 7 June 2025, he played in Hull Kingston Rovers 8-6 Challenge Cup final victory over Warrington. It was the clubs first major trophy in 40 years. On 18 September 2025, Hull Kingston Rovers won the League Leaders Shield in victory over Warrington, McIlorum played a part in Hull Kingston Rovers 1st place season. On 25 September 2025, it was reported that he had decided to retire. On 9 October 2025, he played in Hull Kingston Rovers 2025 Super League Grand Final victory over Wigan.

== International career ==
=== Ireland ===
Being from Irish heritage, McIlorum was named in the Ireland squad for the 2008 Rugby League World Cup.

After not being selected to play for England again after the 2013 World Cup, McIlorum changed his international allegiance back to Ireland in 2017 and was named in their 2017 World Cup squad.

=== England ===
In 2012 McIlorum changed his international allegiance to England and made his England début in the 2012 Autumn International Series against Wales playing at hooker. The following year he was selected as part of England's squad for their 2013 World Cup campaign.

Nine years after his last Test cap for England, he was named in the team's 24-man squad for the 2021 Rugby League World Cup.

== Career stats ==
Appearances and try’s by national team and year
National team	Year	Apps	Tries
Ireland	2008	3	0
England	2011	1	0
England	2012	3	0
England	2013	2	2
Ireland	2017	3	1
England	2022	3	0

== Honours ==
- Super League (3): 2010, 2013, 2025
- Challenge Cup (4): 2011, 2013, 2018, 2025
