= Super League Show =

BBC rugby league programme

- Genre: Rugby League
- Developed by: BBC Sport
- Presented by: Harry Gration (1999-2011); Tanya Arnold (2012-2023)
- Country of origin: United Kingdom
- Original language: English

Production
- Production locations: BBC Yorkshire, Leeds
- Running time: 60 minutes (highlights)
- Production companies: PDI Media; BBC Yorkshire; BBC English Regions

Original release
- Network: BBC One North; BBC Two (repeat)
- Release: 9 May 1999 – 25 September 2023

The Super League Show was a weekly television programme showing highlights from the Super League. It was initially presented by Harry Gration, and from 2012 by Tanya Arnold. Match commentary came from Dave Woods, Matt Newsum, Sharon Shortle and Tim Steere, with some additional commentary occasionally coming from BBC Local Radio commentators. The programme was produced by PDI Media at BBC Yorkshire's studios in Leeds.

Gration and Arnold were joined by one or more guests each week, who gave their thoughts and analysis of the match highlights shown. These segments were originally filmed in a studio, but in later series were filmed pitch-side at one of the week's games.

In February 2024, BBC Sport announced a three-year deal with the league, replacing Channel 4 as the league's live free-to-air partner. The deal added 15 live matches a year to the broadcaster's platforms, but ended the show after 25 years, with condensed highlights of all games instead being added to BBC iPlayer within 24 hours.

== Broadcasts ==
The programme was broadcast to the North West, Yorkshire & North Midlands, North East & Cumbria, and East Yorkshire and Lincolnshire regions on Monday nights at 10.40 p.m. From 2008, it was repeated nationally on BBC Two, originally overnight on Mondays, but then Tuesday lunchtimes, and streamed in the UK on BBC iPlayer. End of season play-offs and World Club Challenge highlights were shown across the whole country in a highlights package.

According to Harry Gration, one of the programme's first pundits, ex-Great Britain captain Garry Schofield, was effectively removed from the show for being too controversial.

== Awards ==
The Super League Show picked up the Royal Television Society Sports Awards for best Nations and Regions Sports Actuality Programme in May 2007. It followed this up by winning Best Sports Programme at the Royal Television Society North West awards evening in November 2007.
