= Challenge Cup =

Rugby league competition organised by the Rugby Football League

- Current season or competition: 2026 Challenge Cup
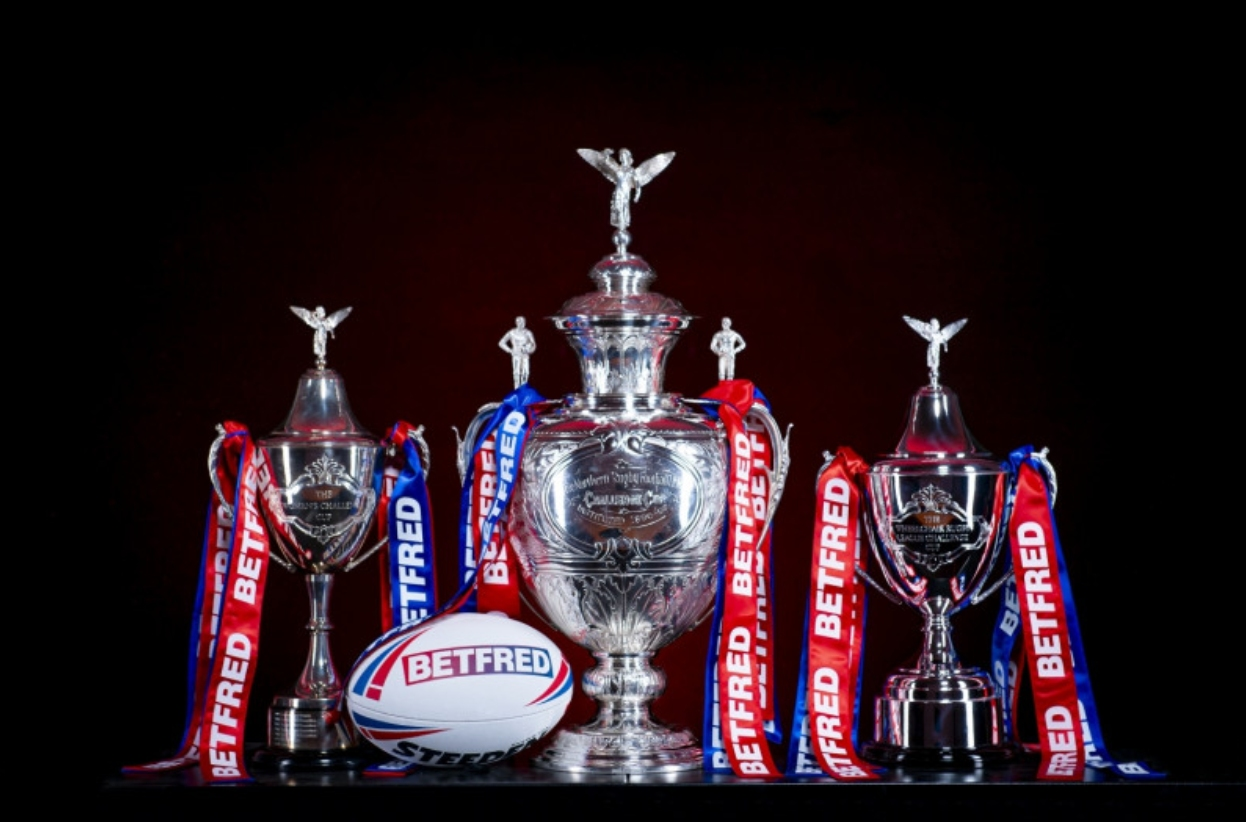
- The women's, men's, and wheelchair Challenge Cup trophies
- Sport: Rugby league
- Instituted: 1896; 130 years ago
- Inaugural season: 1896–97
- Number of teams: 71 (2023)
- Country: England; France; Ireland; Northern Ireland; Scotland; Wales (Note: The Challenge Cup is Great England's premier knockout Cup competition for rugby league. Certain teams from France and Wales compete annually as a result of being part of the British rugby league system. By convention, the champions of Ireland (Republic of Ireland and Northern Ireland), Scotland, and Wales are always invited to complete. Historically, teams from Russia and Serbia, as well as other French sides have been invited on a ad hoc basis.)
- Winners: Wigan Warriors (22nd title) (2026)
- Most titles: Wigan Warriors (22 titles)
- Website: Challenge Cup
- Broadcast partner: BBC; Fox League
- Related competition: Super League; Championship; National Community Rugby League

The Rugby Football League Challenge Cup, commonly known as the Challenge Cup, is a knockout rugby league cup competition organised by the Rugby Football League, held annually since 1896, it is the world's oldest cup competition in either code of rugby. A concurrent Women's Challenge Cup and Wheelchair Challenge Cup have been held since 2012 and 2015 respectively.

The competition is open to all eligible clubs down to Tier 5. Some amateur clubs have to qualify to enter in Round One while others can apply through the RFL to enter.

The final is traditionally played at Wembley Stadium. Despite having been played at other venues, Wembley is generally seen as the home of the competition. "Abide with Me", sung before the game, has become a rugby league anthem.

The current holders of the Challenge Cup are Wigan Warriors, winning the competition for the 22nd time, beating Hull Kingston Rovers 40-10 in the 2026 Final on the 30th May 2026 at Wembley Stadium.

Wigan are the most successful club in the history of the competition, winning the Cup a record 22 times.

== History ==
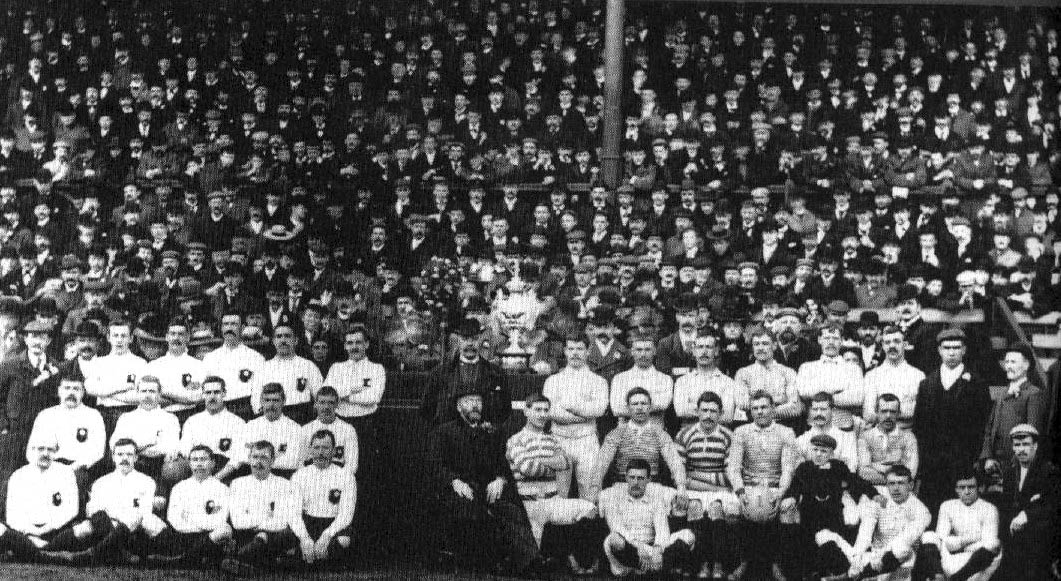
The first ever Challenge Cup Final, 1897: Batley vs. St Helens

The clubs that formed the Northern Union had long been playing in local knock-out cup competitions under the auspices of the Rugby Football Union. The rugby union authorities refused to sanction a nationwide tournament, however, fearing that this would inevitably lead to professionalism. After the schism of 1895, the northern clubs were free to go ahead, and they started the Northern Rugby Football Union Challenge Cup. In 1896 Fattorini's of Bradford were commissioned to manufacture the Challenge Cup at a cost of just £60. Fattorini's also supplied three-guineas winners' medals then valued at thirty shillings (£1.50).

The first competition was held during the 1896–97 season (the second season of the new game), and 52 clubs entered to compete for the trophy. The first final was held at Headingley in Leeds, on 24 April 1897. Batley defeated St. Helens 10–3 in front of a crowd of 13,492 (see picture). The St Helens side did not play in a standardised team jersey.

The competition was later interrupted by the Great War, although it was held in 1915, when the season that had begun before the war was completed. It was then suspended until the end of hostilities. Initially, the final tie was held at one of the larger club grounds in the north, however, noting the excitement in Huddersfield that the town's football team were playing at Wembley in the FA Cup Final and the increasing difficulty for any of the rugby league grounds to satisfy spectator demand to see the final tie, the rugby league authorities voted 13–10 to move to the recently built Wembley Stadium in London, aiming to emulate the FA Cup's success and to put the game on the national stage.

The first final held at Wembley was in 1929 when Wigan beat Dewsbury 13–2 in front of a crowd of 41,500. The final was subsequently held at Wembley in 1930 & 31 but switched to Central Park in Wigan in 1932 as Wembley was not booked by the games administrators.

At the start of the Second World War, rugby league suspended its season immediately, but the Challenge Cup took a single year's break before restarting, on a limited basis and with the support of the authorities, as part of keeping up morale. The Challenge Cup finals, which took place in the game's Northern heartland, got big crowds as the game raised money for prisoners of war and for Lord Beaverbrook's armaments programme.

In 1946, the Lance Todd Trophy was introduced and awarded to the man of the match. The first winner was Billy Stott of Wakefield Trinity while the first winner of the trophy on the losing team was Frank Whitcombe of Bradford Northern in 1948. In itself, it is a prestigious trophy presented only at the Challenge Cup Final. The winner is selected by the members of the Rugby League Writers' Association present at the game and the trophy was presented at a celebratory dinner at the Willows, the home of Salford.

The post World War Two Final crowds almost immediately reached capacity at Wembley – which amounted to multiple 90,000 plus crowds.

1954 saw the Challenge Cup final drawn and the replay set the record for a rugby league match attendance. The match was on 5 May and 102,569 was the official attendance at Odsal Stadium, although it is believed that up to 120,000 spectators were present to see Warrington defeat Halifax 8–4.

The first final that was played under limited tackle rules (Originally 4, later changed to 6) Was the 1967 final between Barrow and Featherstone Rovers.

Wigan became well known for their successes in the Challenge Cup competition, winning every Challenge Cup Final from 1988 to 1995.

Until the 1993–94 season there were very few amateur clubs included in the cup, typically two. For part of the 1980s, and the 1992–93 season the cup was solely for professional clubs. The competition was then opened up to large numbers of amateur clubs as part of a deal between the Rugby Football League and the British Amateur Rugby League Association over bridging the gap between the professional and amateur leagues.

In 1997, a Challenge Cup Plate took place for teams knocked out in the early rounds of the competition. The final took place at Wembley and was won by Hull Kingston Rovers who beat Hunslet 60–14.

The first final that featured use of the Video Referee, for try decisions, was the 1999 final between Leeds Rhinos and London Broncos, which saw the Broncos beaten by a record margin of 52–16 in a Challenge Cup Final.

The 1999 Challenge Cup Final was also the last to be played at the old Wembley Stadium before the construction of the new Wembley Stadium began in 2003. During this time a variety of venues were used to hold the Final including Twickenham, Murrayfield and the Millennium Stadium. The Challenge Cup Final moved back into the new Wembley Stadium for the 2007 Final.

There was a belief that the Challenge Cup final taking place early in the season had led to a decline in the prestige of the cup, so the timing of the competition was altered in 2005

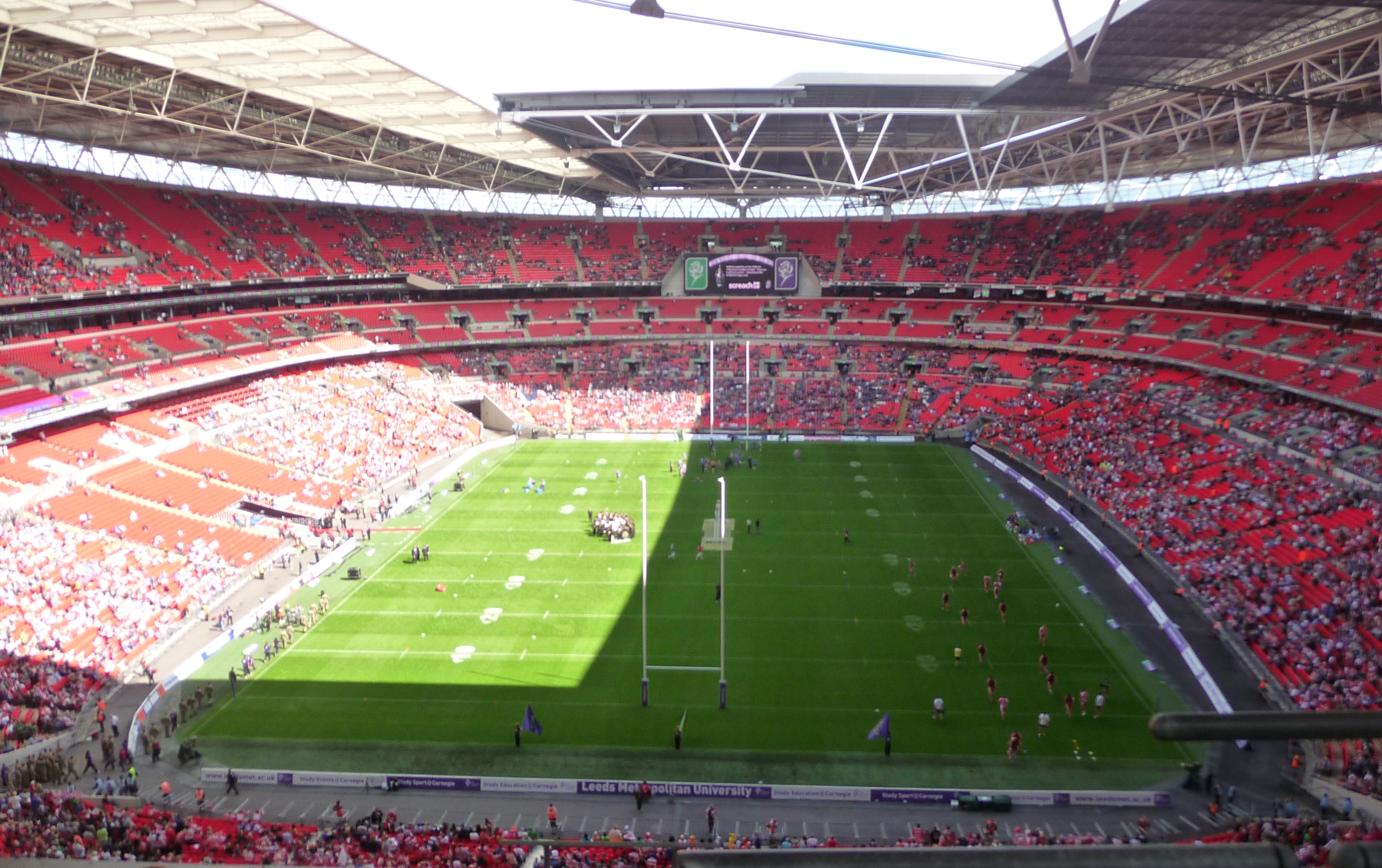
Wembley Stadium before the 2011 Challenge Cup Final

On 26 August 2006 St. Helens scrum-half Sean Long became the first player in the history of the Challenge Cup to collect a third Lance Todd trophy following his man-of-the-match performance in the final against Huddersfield. His other Lance Todd trophy wins came in the 2001 and 2004 Challenge Cup Finals.

On 25 August 2018, Catalans Dragons became the first non-English team to win the Challenge Cup as they defeated Warrington Wolves 20–14 at Wembley.

== Format ==
The current format contains seven round

- Round one: 34 amateur sides begin the competition. The first round sees regional ties with 12 Lancashire teams, 12 Yorkshire teams, and 10 teams from elsewhere in England (refereed to as the "National Group"). Of the 34 team, 4 will be the service teams (Army, Navy, RAF, Police), with one each being assigned to the Lancashire and Yorkshire group. Of the remaining 30 places, priority for participation is given to National Conference League Premier Division sides, then proceeding down the pyramid. In the national group the winners of South Wales Men's League, Scottish National League, and RLI Premiership are also invited.
- Round Two: The 21 RFL Championship teams enter and contest ties with the 17 round one winners. Ties are again drawn regionally.
- Round Three: 13 of the 14 Super League clubs enter (Toulouse Olympique decline to participate in the cup) and join the 19 round two winners. Super League teams are seeded away from home and so they cannot face each other. Ties are no longer regional.
- Round Four: Last Sixteen.
- Quarter-Finals: Last Eight.
- Semi-finals: Played at neutral venues as double-headers with the Women's Challenge Cup semi-finals.
- Final: Played at Wembley Stadium in a triple-header with the Women's Challenge Cup final and the Year 7 Schools' final on the final Saturday of May.

== Venues ==
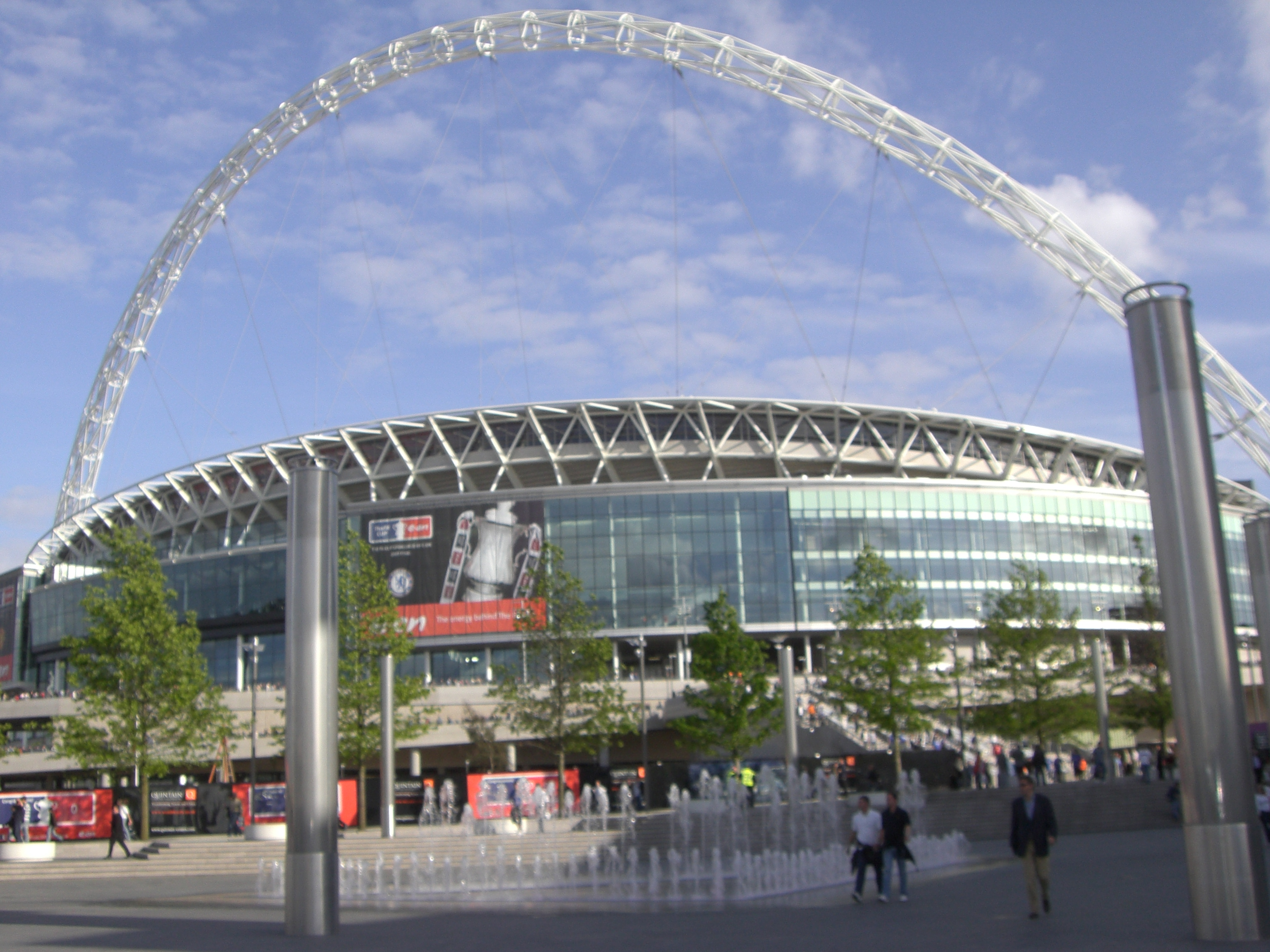
Since 2007 the final has been held at Wembley Stadium

During the first round right through to the quarter-finals the cup is hosted at the stadium of the team who has been drawn at home. The semi finals are hosted at neutral venues so there is no advantage for the home team.

The final is played at Wembley traditionally, having first been played there in 1929. Before, the final had been held in different neutral venues, mostly in the north of England. The first Challenge Cup final was held at Headingley, Leeds between Batley and St. Helens in front of a crowd of 13,492.

== Trophy ==
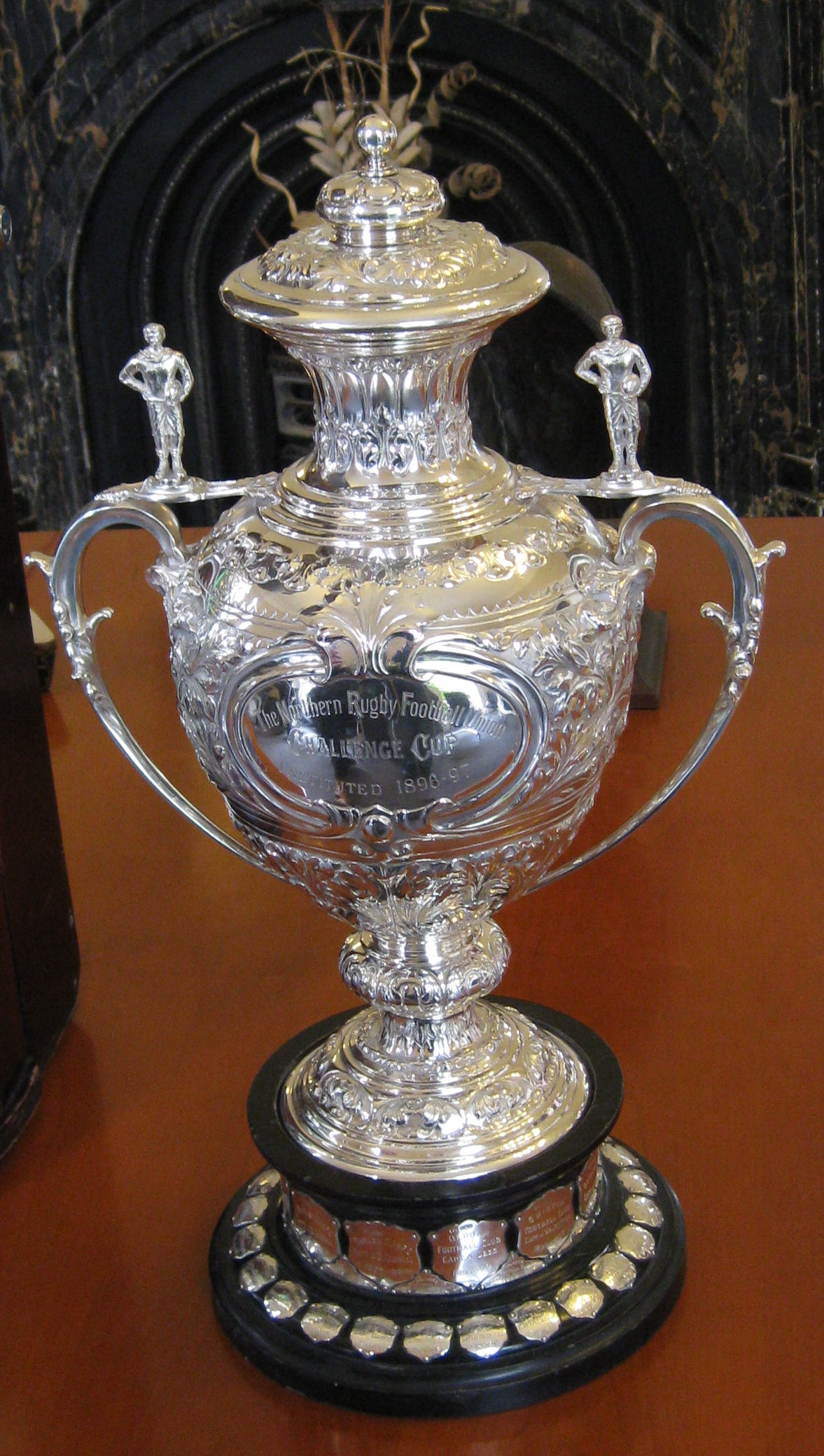
NRFU Challenge Cup first presented 1896–97

The Challenge Cup trophy was designed by silversmiths Fattorini & Sons of Bradford in 1897. The trophy stands 36 inches high, manufactured of solid silver and sits on a black ebony base approximately 8 inches deep.

Tony Collins, the Rugby Football League's archivist, stated in 2007 that, "Fattorini's weren't given any particular commission, just told to come up with something prestigious". The trophy cost £60. The average wage in 1897 was around £2 per week which suggests an equivalent 2007 price of £16,000, although Collins says, "if you wanted something made of silver and with that level of craftsmanship these days, it would be far more expensive. In terms of its subsequent value, the RFL got a bargain."

The trophy currently presented to the winners after the final is not the original which had to be withdrawn due to its delicate condition. As well as the silver wearing thin, it had lost its fluted top and the players on each of the handles had been damaged. The original Fattorini trophy was last presented at the 2001 Challenge Cup Final to St Helens captain Chris Joynt after his team had beaten Bradford. The original trophy is now stored at the RFL's headquarters at Red Hall and only used for promotional appearances.

The trophy used today was created by Jack Spencer (goldsmith) of Sheffield in 800 man-hours and is an almost exact replica of the Fattorini piece. One improvement made with the new version is that the small shields displaying each winning team and captain are now the same size, whereas they had been getting smaller as space ran out on the original. The new trophy's neck has been strengthened. The second trophy was first presented to Wigan, winners of the 2002 Challenge Cup Final.

The winners of the cup in looking after the trophy must "follow a certain code of practice," says Collins. When not in a secure cabinet, the trophy must always be in the presence of someone. When the trophy is taken out overnight, somebody must sleep in the same room and if taken in a car there must be two people in attendance. Collins reveals that, "When it went down to France for some Catalans publicity photos, it even had its seat on the plane."

== Awards ==
The Lance Todd Trophy, named in memory of Lance Todd, is awarded to the man-of-the-match in the Challenge Cup Final. The winner is decided each year by those members of the Rugby League Writers' Association present at the match.

The Trophy was first presented in 1946 to William "Billy" Stott of Wakefield Trinity.

The current holder of the trophy Jack Farrimond of Wigan Warriors following their victory over Hull Kingston Rovers in the 2026 final.

== Sponsorship ==
Challenge Cup logo during the Powergen sponsorship era

Challenge Cup logo during the Carnegie sponsorship era

The Challenge Cup has been sponsored since 1980, with the sponsor being able to determine the cup's sponsorship name. There have been eight sponsors with Betfred being the current sponsors.

The official rugby ball supplier is Steeden.

| Period | Sponsor | Name |
|---|---|---|
| 1979–1985 | State Express | State Express Challenge Cup |
| 1985–2001 | Silk Cut | Silk Cut Challenge Cup |
| 2002–2003 | Kellogg's Nutrigrain | Kellogg's Nutrigrain Challenge Cup |
| 2004–2007 | Powergen | Powergen Challenge Cup |
| 2008–2012 | Leeds Met Carnegie | Carnegie Challenge Cup |
| 2013–2014 | Tetley's | Tetley's Challenge Cup |
| 2015–2018 | Ladbrokes | Ladbrokes Challenge Cup |
| 2019–2020 | Coral | Coral Challenge Cup |
| 2021–2026 | Betfred | Betfred Challenge Cup |

== Notable events in finals ==
The most tries scored in a final was 5 scored by Tom Briscoe (Leeds Rhinos v Hull KR in 2015), who also holds the record for most tries in total from one player (7 for Leeds, 2014 – 1, 2015 – 5, 2020 – 1) one ahead of Kevin Iro (6 for Wigan, 1988 – 2, 1989 – 2, 1990 – 2).

The first hat trick of tries in a final was scored by Robbie Paul for Bradford Bulls v St Helens in 1996. Three years later, Leroy Rivett scored 4 for Leeds Rhinos against London Broncos in 1999. Some players previously missed out on becoming the first to score a hat trick due to tries being disallowed, such as Martin Offiah (Wigan v Castleford in 1992), Tony Iro (Wigan v Halifax in 1988) & Kevin Iro (Wigan v Warrington in 1990).

Graham Rees scored the quickest Challenge Cup Final try after just 35 seconds for St Helens against Leeds in 1972.

The most famous final was the 1968 'Watersplash' game between Leeds and Wakefield Trinity. Due to a heavy thunderstorm both before and during the match, the pitch became totally waterlogged. In the final minute, with Leeds 11 – 7 in front, Wakefield winger Ken Hurst scored under the posts, and Don Fox (Who had already won the Lance Todd Trophy that day) had a match winning conversion to take in injury time. But due to the saturated pitch, he miskicked the ball, sending it wide of the posts. Despite a successful career for both club and country, Fox has always been remembered for that one infamous moment.

The first player to be sent off in a final was Syd Hynes, for Leeds against Leigh in 1971, for headbutting Alex Murphy. Hynes has always protested his innocence over the incident. Richard Eyres of Widnes was shown a red card for an off the ball elbow on Martin Offiah of Wigan in the 1993 final, and was banned for 6 games as a result.

The first final to be decided by golden point was in 2023 with Leigh Leopards scoring a drop goal against Hull KR via Lachlan Lam. 2023 also saw the first occasion of the Women's Challenge Cup final featuring at Wembley Stadium, prior to the men's final.

The 2024 final was known as the Rob Burrow final, with several tributes held to the former Leeds Rhinos player following his death days before the game. Aligned to his former number 7 jersey, the match kicked off at 3.07pm and a minute's applause was held on the seventh minute with all players lining up with Rob Burrow shirts prior to kickoff and fans holding up large banners as tribute before kickoff.

== Challenge Cup Finals ==
In total, 26 different clubs have won the Challenge Cup and 30 different teams have appeared in the final. Wigan Warriors hold the record for most wins with 22 and have appeared in 34 finals. In 2007, Catalans Dragons became the first non English team to reach the final but lost to St. Helens.

| Team | Winners | Runners-up | Years won |
|---|---|---|---|
| Wigan Warriors | 22 | 12 | 1924, 1929, 1948, 1951, 1958, 1959, 1965, 1985, 1988, 1989, 1990, 1991, 1992, 1993, 1994, 1995, 2002, 2011, 2013, 2022, 2024, 2026 |
| Leeds Rhinos | 14 | 12 | 1910, 1923, 1932, 1936, 1941, 1942, 1957, 1968, 1977, 1978, 1999, 2014, 2015, 2020 |
| St Helens | 13 | 10 | 1956, 1961, 1966, 1972, 1976, 1996, 1997, 2001, 2004, 2006, 2007, 2008, 2021 |
| Warrington Wolves | 9 | 12 | 1905, 1907, 1950, 1954, 1974, 2009, 2010, 2012, 2019 |
| Widnes Vikings | 7 | 6 | 1930, 1937, 1964, 1975, 1979, 1981, 1984 |
| Huddersfield Giants | 6 | 5 | 1913, 1915, 1920, 1933, 1945, 1953 |
| Hull FC | 5 | 12 | 1914, 1982, 2005, 2016, 2017 |
| Halifax | 5 | 7 | 1903, 1904, 1931, 1939, 1987 |
| Bradford Bulls | 5 | 6 | 1944, 1947, 1949, 2000, 2003 |
| Wakefield Trinity | 5 | 3 | 1909, 1946, 1960, 1962, 1963 |
| Castleford Tigers | 4 | 3 | 1935, 1969, 1970, 1986 |
| Oldham | 3 | 4 | 1899, 1925, 1927 |
| Swinton Lions | 3 | 2 | 1900, 1926, 1928 |
| Featherstone Rovers | 3 | 2 | 1967, 1973, 1983 |
| Batley Bulldogs | 3 | 0 | 1897, 1898, 1901 |
| Leigh Leopards | 3 | 0 | 1921, 1971, 2023 |
| Hull Kingston Rovers | 2 | 7 | 1980, 2025 |
| Hunslet | 2 | 2 | 1908, 1934 |
| Dewsbury Rams | 2 | 1 | 1912, 1943 |
| Broughton Rangers § | 2 | 0 | 1902, 1911 |
| Salford Red Devils | 1 | 7 | 1938 |
| Barrow Raiders | 1 | 4 | 1955 |
| Workington Town | 1 | 2 | 1952 |
| Bradford FC § | 1 | 1 | 1906 |
| Catalans Dragons± | 1 | 1 | 2018 |
| Rochdale Hornets | 1 | 0 | 1922 |
| Sheffield Eagles | 1 | 0 | 1998 |
| York | 0 | 1 | – |
| Keighley Cougars | 0 | 1 | – |
| London Broncos | 0 | 1 | – |

- § Denotes club now defunct
- ± Denotes a non-English club.

=== The Double ===
| | Club | Wins | Winning years |
|---|---|---|---|
| 1 | Wigan Warriors | 8 | 1990–91, 1991–92, 1992–93, 1993–94, 1994–95, 1995–96, 2013, 2024 |
| 2 | St. Helens | 4 | 1965–66, 1996, 2006, 2021 |
| 3 | Huddersfield Giants | 2 | 1912–13, 1914–15 |
| 4 | Swinton Lions | 1 | 1927–28 |
| 4 | Broughton Rangers | 1 | 1901–02 |
| 4 | Halifax Panthers | 1 | 1902–03 |
| 4 | Hunslet F.C. | 1 | 1907–08 |
| 4 | Bradford Bulls | 1 | 2003 |
| 4 | Leeds Rhinos | 1 | 2015 |
| 4 | Hull Kingston Rovers | 1 | 2025 |

=== The Treble ===
| | Club | Wins | Winning years |
|---|---|---|---|
| 1 | Wigan Warriors | 4 | 1991–92, 1993–94, 1994–95, 2024 |
| 2 | Huddersfield Giants | 2 | 1912–13, 1914–15 |
| 2 | St. Helens | 2 | 1965–66, 2006 |
| 4 | Swinton Lions | 1 | 1927–28 |
| 4 | Bradford Bulls | 1 | 2003 |
| 4 | Leeds Rhinos | 1 | 2015 |
| 4 | Hull Kingston Rovers | 1 | 2025 |

=== The Quadruple ===
| | Club | Wins | Winning years |
|---|---|---|---|
| 1 | Wigan Warriors | 2 (Note: Wigan have a widely misreported quadruple in 1994–95, with the club winning the treble in addition to the 1994–95 Regal Trophy. Note: No World Club Challenge was held in 1995 as it did not become a regular competition until 2000.) | 1993–94, 2024 (Note: This is the first widely reported quadruple to include the calendar year's World Club Challenge and not the following season's. Note: The 2025 World Club Challenge was abandoned by Penrith Panthers, although no title was awarded for 2025, Wigan, without challenge, retained their title for a second year.) |
| 2 | Bradford Bulls | 1 | 2003 |
| 2 | St. Helens | 1 | 2006 |
| 2 | Hull Kingston Rovers | 1 | 2026 |

=== All Four Cups ===
| | Club | Wins | Winning years |
|---|---|---|---|
| 1 | Hunslet | 1 | 1907–08 |
| 2 | Huddersfield | 1 | 1914–15 |
| 3 | Swinton | 1 | 1927–28 |

== Broadcast ==
The BBC first covered the final of this competition when Wigan beat Bradford Northern in 1948. At that time though the only TV transmitter was in London, so fans up North never got to see it. It was another four years before another final was covered when Workington Town beat Featherstone Rovers in 1952. The cup final was not broadcast on TV again until the 1958 final between Wigan and Workington Town since when it has been shown every year. The inception of Grandstand also saw coverage of earlier rounds start to be shown during the 1960s with ITV's World of Sport even showing games as well for a short period.

The BBC has been the predominant broadcaster, showing every final live since 1958 (except the 1982 Final Replay shown as highlights). Eddie Waring was the first commentator for BBC coverage. When he retired, commentary was covered by Ray French and he continued to work for the BBC for a number of years, albeit in semi-retirement, with his last Challenge Cup Final in 2008. From 2009, the present day main commentator is Dave Woods. He usually commentates with Brian Noble, Jonathan Davies, Iestyn Harris or Ian Millward. Nowadays, the BBC continues to broadcast the tournament with Clare Balding hosting from 2006 to 2012 until her move to Channel 4 Racing. Mark Chapman was secondary host in 2012 when Balding was unavailable for the cup and international matches, and previous hosts for the BBC include John Inverdale and Steve Rider. The current main hosts (as of 2013) are Mark Chapman and Super League Show presenter Tanya Arnold.

From 2012–2021, Sky Sports held the rights for the early rounds with one match each round and two quarter finals; whilst BBC Sport showed two sixth round matches, two quarter finals, both semi-finals and the final.

From 2022 onwards, Premier Sports will begin to broadcast games from the fourth round up to the quarter-finals alongside BBC.

| Duration | Broadcaster |
|---|---|
| 1958–2011 | BBC Sport |
| 2012–2021 | BBC Sport (2 R6 matches, 2 Quarter finals, 2 Semi finals and Final only); Sky Sports (1 R5 match, 1 R6 match, and 2 Quarter finals only) |
| 2022–2024 | BBC Sport (2 R6 matches, 2 Quarter finals, 2 Semi finals and Final only); Premier Sports (1 R4 match, 1 R5 match, 1 R6 match, and 2 Quarter finals only) |

=== International ===
| Country/ Region | Broadcaster |
|---|---|
| France | beIn Sports |
| New Zealand | Sky Sport |
| New Zealand | Māori Television |
| United States | Fox Soccer Plus |
| Brazil | BandSports |
| Russia | NTV+ |
| Balkans | Sportklub |
| Australia | Fox League |
| Canada | Game TV and CBC Sports |

== See also ==
- Women's Challenge Cup
- Wheelchair Challenge Cup
- Amco Cup
- Lord Derby Cup
- British rugby league system
- List of sports attendance figures
- Super League
