= Andy Coley =

GB & England international rugby league footballer

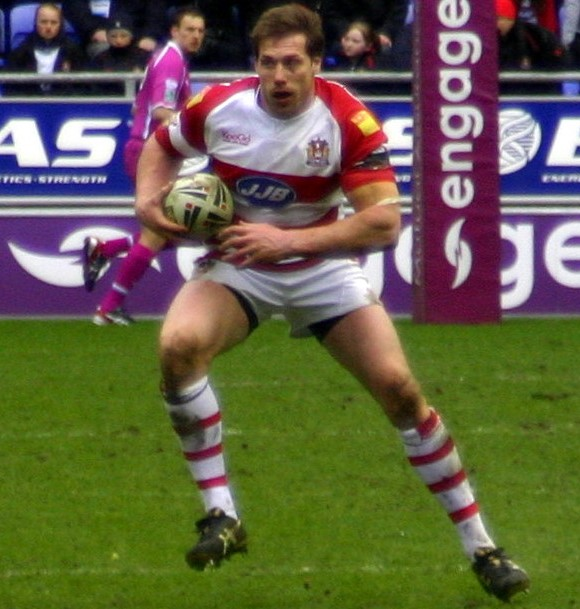

Personal information
- Full name: Andrew Scott Coley
- Born: 7 July 1978 (age 47) Warrington, Cheshire, England

Playing information
- Height: 6 ft 3 in (1.90 m)
- Weight: 16 st 5 lb (104 kg)
- Position: Prop, Second-row
Club
Years	Team	Pld	T	G	FG	P
1997–00	Swinton Lions	64	20	0	0	80
2001–07	Salford City Reds	191	50	0	0	200
2008–11	Wigan Warriors	125	13	0	0	52
	Total	380	83	0	0	332
Representative
Years	Team	Pld	T	G	FG	P
2001	Lancashire	1	0	0	0	0
2004	England	3	4	0	0	16
2007	Great Britain	1	0	0	0	0

Andrew Scott Coley (born 7 July 1978) is an English former professional rugby league footballer who played as a prop and second-row forward in the 1990s, 2000s and 2010s. A Great Britain and England international forward, he played in the Super League for the Salford City Reds and the Wigan Warriors.

== Career ==
=== Early career ===
Born in Warrington, Coley began playing rugby league for local amateur side Laporte ARL.

=== Swinton Lions ===
He turned professional in 1997, joining the Swinton Lions.

In March 2000, Coley suffered a cruciate ligament injury, which ruled him out for the rest of the season.

=== Salford City Reds ===
In 2001, Coley signed for Salford City Reds as a second-row prior to the 2001's Super League VI, but subsequently moved up into the front row. Coley impressed in his first season at the club, and was rewarded with a new four-year contract. He required another knee operation at the end of the year, which ruled him out of the first few months of the 2002 season.

In 2004, Coley signed a new three-year contract with Salford.

Coley agreed a deal to join Wigan Warriors in September 2007 from Salford City Reds who were relegated in the 2007 Super League season.

=== Wigan Warriors ===
Coley was first team prop at the Wigan Warriors since his arrival.

He played in the 2010 Super League Grand Final victory over St Helens at Old Trafford.

Coley played as a prop forward in the 2011 Challenge Cup Final victory over the Leeds Rhinos at Wembley Stadium. Shortly before the final, Coley announced he would be retiring from rugby league at the end of the 2011 season.

=== Representative career ===
Coley's first representative honours came in 2001 when he represented Lancashire.

In 2004, he was selected for England during their victorious European Nations Cup campaign, scoring a hat trick of tries on his England début against Russia.

In 2006, he received his first call-up for Great Britain when he was selected for the 2006 Tri Nations. He appeared as a substitute in a warm-up game against Newcastle, but did not feature in any Test matches during the tournament. In June 2007, Coley won his first and only cap for Great Britain in a 42–14 win against France.

== Post-playing career ==
Coley is a qualified quantity surveyor, and became Operations Director of a company in the construction industry.
