= Dave Woods (commentator) =

British sports commentator

Dave Woods is a British sports commentator. He covers rugby league and football for the BBC and BT Sport as well as occasional freelance work for Five in their Champions League and Europa League coverage.

Woods began his sports journalism career at Wigan-based news agency Barnes in 1985, moving to the BBC in 1990.

He commentated on the Europa League 2012 Final alongside Stan Collymore. Woods is the main man on the Super League Show. He has attended every Challenge Cup Final since 1974. In 2009, he commentated on his first Challenge Cup Final, succeeding Ray French.

Dave Woods used to lecture in radio at the University of Huddersfield, but left in July 2008.

Dave Woods commentated for HBS during the 2006 FIFA World Cup, 2010 FIFA World Cup, 2014 FIFA World Cup, UEFA Euro 2008 and UEFA Euro 2012 in addition to the 2015 FIFA Women's World Cup.

Dave Woods commentates for Premier Sports on their coverage of the Rugby League Northern Rail Cup and Championship.

In 2020, Woods qualified as a personal trainer, and went on to set up FitBox, a gymnasium in Westhoughton.
