= Tanya Arnold =

British sports journalist

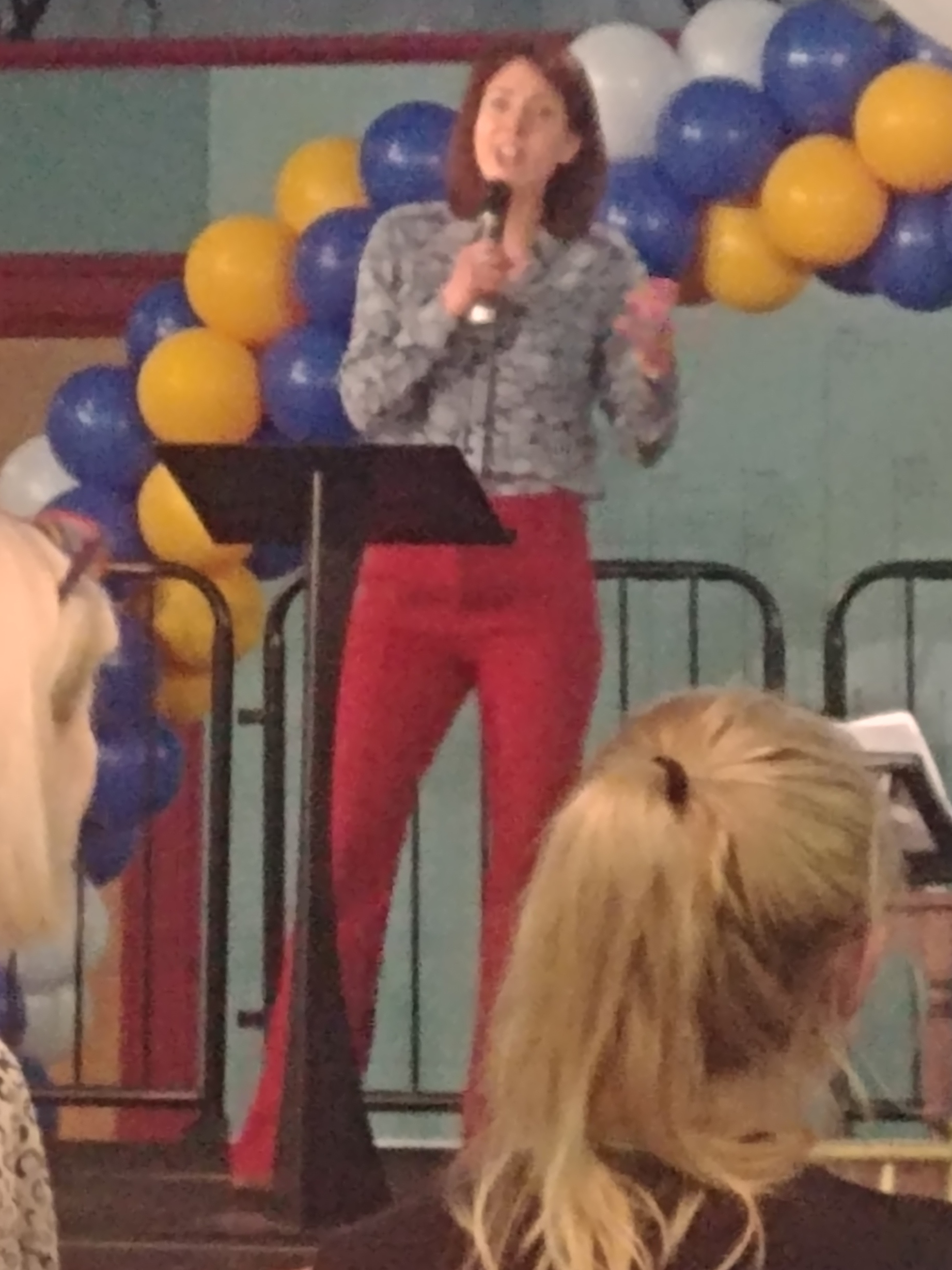
Tanya Arnold, Sporting Heritage Awards, Leeds City Museum, 2022

Tanya Arnold (born 3 January 1977) is a British sports journalist and former television presenter for BBC Look North. She was a presenter of the Rugby League World Cup 2022. In 2012 she joined the Super League Show, as one of Britain's first female sports presenters. She began her career at Look North in 1998. One of her first roles as a sports reporter was covering Leeds United football team.

In 2021 she presented the inaugural Sporting Heritage Awards.

Arnold grew up watching the BBC television sports show, Grandstand, which sparked in her the desire to work in sport. She has credited Brian Noble, Peter Lorimer and Eleanor Oldroyd as mentors to her career.

In January 2023, Arnold announced she was leaving BBC Look North to become a freelance champion of women's professional and elite sport.
