= 2016 Wigan Warriors season =

- Super League XXI champions
- Super League XXI Rank: 2nd
- Play-off result: Champions
- Challenge Cup: Semi-finals
- 2016 record: Wins: 18; draws: 0; losses: 7
- Points scored: For: 455; against: 440

Team information
- Chairman: Ian Lenagan
- Head Coach: Shaun Wane
- Captain: Sean O'Loughlin
- Stadium: DW Stadium

Top scorers
- Tries: Dominic Manfredi - 8
- Goals: Matty Smith - 30
- Points: Matty Smith - 72
← 2015	List of seasons	2017 →

This article details the Wigan Warriors rugby league football club's 2016 season. This is the Warriors 21st season in the Super League.

== World Club Series ==
LEGEND
Win
Draw
Loss

Date	Competition	Vrs	H/A	Venue	Result	Score	Tries	Goals	Att
20/2/16	WCS	Brisbane	H	DW Stadium	L	12-42	Sarginson, Williams	Smith 2/2	Attendance

2016 World Club Series Teams
Wigan Warriors	positions	Brisbane Broncos
22. Lewis Tierney	Fullback	1. Darius Boyd
20. Oliver Gildart	Winger	2. Greg Eden
3. Anthony Gelling	Centre	3. Jordan Kahu
4. Dan Sarginson	Centre	4. James Roberts
5. Dominic Manfredi	Winger	5. Corey Oates
6. George Williams	Stand off	6. Anthony Milford
7. Matty Smith	Scrum half	7. Kodi Nikorima
13. Sean O'Loughlin	Prop	10. Adam Blair
9. Michael McIlorum	Hooker	9. Andrew McCullough
10. Ben Flower	Prop	15. Josh McGuire
12. Liam Farrell	2nd Row	11. Alex Glenn
25. Willie Isa	2nd Row	12. Matt Gillett
14. John Bateman	Loose forward	13. Corey Parker
15. Tony Clubb	Interchange	8. Sam Thaiday
16. Sam Powell	Interchange	14. Jarrod Wallace
19. Taulima Tautai	Interchange	16. Joe Ofahengaue
21. Ryan Sutton	Interchange	17. Travis Waddell
Shaun Wane	Coach	Wayne Bennett

== Super League ==
LEGEND
Win
Draw
Loss

=== Regular season ===
==== Matches ====
Date	Competition	Rnd	Vrs	H/A	Venue	Result	Score	Tries	Goals	Att	Live on TV
5/2/16	Super League XXI	1	Catalans Dragons	H	DW Stadium	W	12-6	McIlorum (2)	Smith 2/3	13,436	Sky Sports
12/2/16	Super League XXI	2	Huddersfield	A	Galpharm Stadium	W	18-13	L.Farrell, Manfredi, Charnley	Smith 3/3	5,912	Sky Sports
26/2/16	Super League XXI	3	Salford	H	DW Stadium	W	20-16	Gildart (2), Gelling, Manfredi	Smith 2/4	10,897	-
4/3/16	Super League XXI	4	Hull F.C.	A	KC Stadium	W	26-25	Flower, Williams, Bateman, Charnley	Smith 4/4, Smith 2 DG	10,660	-
11/3/16	Super League XXI	5	Leeds	H	DW Stadium	W	28-6	Bateman, Gildart, Manfredi, Clubb, Gelling	Smith 4/5	14,425	Sky Sports
17/3/16	Super League XXI	6	Widnes	H	DW Stadium	L	12-18	L.Farrell, Charnley (2)	Smith 0/3	11,773	Sky Sports
25/3/16	Super League XXI	7	St. Helens	A	Langtree Park	W	24-12	Manfredi, Powell, J.Tomkins, Smith	Smith 4/4	Attendance	Sky Sports
28/3/16	Super League XXI	8	Hull Kingston Rovers	H	DW Stadium	W	30-16	Tierney, Charnley (3), Manfredi, Gildart	Charnley 3/6	11,268	-
1/4/16	Super League XXI	9	Warrington	H	DW Stadium	L	16-28	Manfredi (3)	Charnley 2/3	17,480	Sky Sports
10/4/16	Super League XXI	10	Wakefield Trinity	A	Belle Vue	L	0-62	-	-	5,751	Sky Sports
15/4/16	Super League XXI	11	Castleford	H	DW Stadium	W	26-12	Tierney, Bateman (2), Gregson	Smith 5/5	11,849	Sky Sports
21/4/16	Super League XXI	12	Huddersfield	H	DW Stadium	W	26-19	Gelling, Bateman, Smith, Sarginson	Smith 4/4, Smith 2 DG	10,914	Sky Sports
28/4/16	Super League XXI	13	Warrington	A	Halliwell Jones Stadium	W/D/L	Score	Try Scorers	Goal Scorers	Attendance	Sky Sports

==== Table ====
Pos	Team	Pld	W	D	L	PF	PA	PD	Pts	Qualification
1	Hull F.C.	23	17	0	6	605	465	+140	34	Super League Super 8s
2	Warrington Wolves	23	16	1	6	675	425	+250	33	Super League Super 8s
3	Wigan Warriors	23	16	0	7	455	440	+15	32	Super League Super 8s
4	St Helens	23	14	0	9	573	536	+37	28	Super League Super 8s
5	Catalans Dragons	23	13	0	10	593	505	+88	26	Super League Super 8s
6	Castleford Tigers	23	10	1	12	617	640	−23	21	Super League Super 8s
7	Widnes Vikings	23	10	0	13	499	474	+25	20	Super League Super 8s
8	Wakefield Trinity Wildcats	23	10	0	13	485	654	−169	20	Super League Super 8s
9	Leeds Rhinos	23	8	0	15	404	576	−172	16	The Qualifiers
10	Salford Red Devils	23	10	0	13	560	569	−9	14 (Note: Salford deducted 6 points for salary cap breaches in 2014 and 2015.)	The Qualifiers
11	Hull Kingston Rovers	23	6	2	15	486	610	−124	14	The Qualifiers
12	Huddersfield Giants	23	6	0	17	511	569	−58	12	The Qualifiers

Source: Rugby League Project
Rules for classification: 1) Points; 2) Points difference; 3) Number of points scored;

=== Super 8's ===
==== Matches ====
Date	Competition	Rnd	Vrs	H/A	Venue	Result	Score	Tries	Goals	Att	Live on TV
0/0/16	Super League XXI	S1	Team	H/A	Stadium	W/D/L	Score	Try Scorers	Goal Scorers	Attendance	TV
0/0/16	Super League XXI	S2	Team	H/A	Stadium	W/D/L	Score	Try Scorers	Goal Scorers	Attendance	TV
0/0/16	Super League XXI	S3	Team	H/A	Stadium	W/D/L	Score	Try Scorers	Goal Scorers	Attendance	TV
0/0/16	Super League XXI	S4	Team	H/A	Stadium	W/D/L	Score	Try Scorers	Goal Scorers	Attendance	TV
0/0/16	Super League XXI	S5	Team	H/A	Stadium	W/D/L	Score	Try Scorers	Goal Scorers	Attendance	TV
0/0/16	Super League XXI	S6	Team	H/A	Stadium	W/D/L	Score	Try Scorers	Goal Scorers	Attendance	TV
0/0/16	Super League XXI	S7	Team	H/A	Stadium	W/D/L	Score	Try Scorers	Goal Scorers	Attendance	TV

==== Table ====
Pos	Team	Pld	W	D	L	PF	PA	PD	Pts	Qualification
1	Warrington Wolves (L)	30	21	1	8	852	541	+311	43	Semi-finals
2	Wigan Warriors (C)	30	21	0	9	669	560	+109	42	Semi-finals
3	Hull F.C.	30	20	0	10	749	579	+170	40	Semi-finals
4	St Helens	30	20	0	10	756	641	+115	40	Semi-finals
5	Castleford Tigers	30	15	1	14	830	808	+22	31	
6	Catalans Dragons	30	15	0	15	723	716	+7	30	
7	Widnes Vikings	30	12	0	18	603	643	−40	24	
8	Wakefield Trinity	30	10	0	20	571	902	−331	20	

Source: BBC Sport
(C) Champions; (L) League Leaders' Shield Winners

=== Play-offs ===
Date	Competition	Rnd	Vrs	H/A	Venue	Result	Score	Tries	Goals	Att	Live on TV
0/0/16	Super League XXI	Semi-final	Team	H/A	Stadium	W/D/L	Score	Try Scorers	Goal Scorers	Attendance	TV
0/0/16	Super League XXI	Grand Final	Team	H/A	Stadium	W/D/L	Score	Try Scorers	Goal Scorers	Attendance	TV

=== Player appearances ===
FB=Fullback	C=Centre	W=Winger	SO=Stand-off	SH=Scrum half	PR=Prop	H=Hooker	SR=Second Row	L=Loose forward	B=Bench

No	Player	1	2	3	4	5	6	7	8	9	10	11	12	13	14	15	16	17	18	19	20	21	22	23	S1	S2	S3	S4	S5	S6	S7
1	Sam Tomkins													x	x	x	x	x	x	x	x	x	x	x	x	x	x	x	x	x	x
2	Josh Charnley	W	W		W	W	W	W	W	W	W	W	W	x	x	x	x	x	x	x	x	x	x	x	x	x	x	x	x	x	x
3	Anthony Gelling	C	C	C	C	C	C	C	C				C	x	x	x	x	x	x	x	x	x	x	x	x	x	x	x	x	x	x
4	Dan Sarginson	C	C	C	C	FB	FB	FB	B	FB	FB	FB	FB	x	x	x	x	x	x	x	x	x	x	x	x	x	x	x	x	x	x
5	Dominic Manfredi	W	W	W	W	W	W	W	W	W				x	x	x	x	x	x	x	x	x	x	x	x	x	x	x	x	x	x
6	George Williams	SO		SO	SO									x	x	x	x	x	x	x	x	x	x	x	x	x	x	x	x	x	x
7	Matty Smith	SH	SH	SH	SH	SH	SH	SH	SH	SH	SH	SH	SH	x	x	x	x	x	x	x	x	x	x	x	x	x	x	x	x	x	x
8	Dom Crosby											B		x	x	x	x	x	x	x	x	x	x	x	x	x	x	x	x	x	x
9	Michael McIlorum	H	H											x	x	x	x	x	x	x	x	x	x	x	x	x	x	x	x	x	x
10	Ben Flower	P	P	P	P	P	P	P					P	x	x	x	x	x	x	x	x	x	x	x	x	x	x	x	x	x	x
11	Joel Tomkins							SR	SR	SR	SR	SR		x	x	x	x	x	x	x	x	x	x	x	x	x	x	x	x	x	x
12	Liam Farrell	SR	SR	SR	SR	SR	SR			SR				x	x	x	x	x	x	x	x	x	x	x	x	x	x	x	x	x	x
13	Sean O'Loughlin	P	P	L		SO	SO	SO	SO	SO				x	x	x	x	x	x	x	x	x	x	x	x	x	x	x	x	x	x
14	John Bateman	L	L	SR	SR	SR	SR	SR	L			C	SR	x	x	x	x	x	x	x	x	x	x	x	x	x	x	x	x	x	x
15	Tony Clubb	B	B	B	B	P	P	P	P	P	P	P	B	x	x	x	x	x	x	x	x	x	x	x	x	x	x	x	x	x	x
16	Sam Powell	B	SO	H	H	H	H	H	B	H	H	H	H	x	x	x	x	x	x	x	x	x	x	x	x	x	x	x	x	x	x
17	Lee Mossop			B	B	B	B	B	P	P	P	P	P	x	x	x	x	x	x	x	x	x	x	x	x	x	x	x	x	x	x
18	Warriors Fans	-	-	-	-	-	-	-	-	-	-	-	-	-	-	-	-	-	-	-	-	-	-	-	-	-	-	-	-	-	-
19	Taulima Tautai	B	B	B	B	B	L	B	B	B	B	B	B	x	x	x	x	x	x	x	x	x	x	x	x	x	x	x	x	x	x
20	Oliver Gildart	x	x	W	B	C	C	C	C	C	C	C	C	x	x	x	x	x	x	x	x	x	x	x	x	x	x	x	x	x	x
21	Ryan Sutton	B	B	P	P	B	B	B	B	B	L	L	L	x	x	x	x	x	x	x	x	x	x	x	x	x	x	x	x	x	x
22	Lewis Tierney	FB	FB	FB	FB	x	x	x	FB	x	W	W	W	x	x	x	x	x	x	x	x	x	x	x	x	x	x	x	x	x	x
23	Connor Farrell	x	x	x	x	x	x	x	x	x	x	x	x	x	x	x	x	x	x	x	x	x	x	x	x	x	x	x	x	x	x
24	Rhodri Lloyd	x	x	x	x	x	x	x	x	x	x	x	x	x	x	x	x	x	x	x	x	x	x	x	x	x	x	x	x	x	x
25	Willie Isa	SR	SR							B	SR	SR	SR	x	x	x	x	x	x	x	x	x	x	x	x	x	x	x	x	x	x
26	Greg Burke	x	B	B	L	L	B	L		L	B	B	B	x	x	x	x	x	x	x	x	x	x	x	x	x	x	x	x	x	x
27	Nick Gregson	x	x	x	x	B	B	B	SR	B	SO	SO	SO	x	x	x	x	x	x	x	x	x	x	x	x	x	x	x	x	x	x
28	Jake Shorrocks	x	x	x	x	x	x	x	x	x	x	x	x	x	x	x	x	x	x	x	x	x	x	x	x	x	x	x	x	x	x
29	Joe Bretherton	x	x	x	x	x	x	x	x	x	B	B	x	x	x	x	x	x	x	x	x	x	x	x	x	x	x	x	x	x	x
30	Jack Higginson	x	x	x	x	x	x	x	x	C	C	x	x	x	x	x	x	x	x	x	x	x	x	x	x	x	x	x	x	x	x
31	Gabriel Fell	x	x	x	x	x	x	x	x	x	x	x	x	x	x	x	x	x	x	x	x	x	x	x	x	x	x	x	x	x	x
32	Luke Waterworth	x	x	x	x	x	x	x	H	x	x	x	x	x	x	x	x	x	x	x	x	x	x	x	x	x	x	x	x	x	x
33	Jack Wells	x	x	x	x	x	x	x	x	x	B	x	B	x	x	x	x	x	x	x	x	x	x	x	x	x	x	x	x	x	x

= Injured

= Suspended

== Challenge Cup ==
LEGEND
Win
Draw
Loss

Date	Competition	Rnd	Vrs	H/A	Venue	Result	Score	Tries	Goals	Att	TV
8/5/16	Cup	6th	Dewsbury	A	Rams Stadium	W/D/L	Score	Try Scorers	Goal Scorers	Attendance	TV

=== Player appearances ===
FB=Fullback	C=Centre	W=Winger	SO=Stand Off	SH=Scrum half	P=Prop	H=Hooker	SR=Second Row	L=Loose forward	B=Bench

No	Player	6
1	Sam Tomkins	x
2	Josh Charnley	x
3	Anthony Gelling	x
4	Dan Sarginson	x
5	Dominic Manfredi	x
6	George Williams	x
7	Matty Smith	x
8	Dom Crosby	x
9	Michael McIlorum	x
10	Ben Flower	x
11	Joel Tomkins	x
12	Liam Farrell	x
13	Sean O'Loughlin	x
14	John Bateman	x
15	Tony Clubb	x
16	Sam Powell	x
17	Lee Mossop	x
18	Warriors Fans	x
19	Taulima Tautai	x
20	Oliver Gildart	x
21	Ryan Sutton	x
22	Lewis Tierney	x
23	Connor Farrell	x
24	Rhodri Lloyd	x
25	Willie Isa	x
26	Greg Burke	x
27	Nick Gregson	x
28	Jake Shorrocks	x
29	Joe Bretherton	x
30	Jack Higginson	x
31	Gabriel Fell	x
32	Luke Waterworth	x

== Squad statistics ==
- Appearances and points include (Super League, Challenge Cup and Play-offs) as of 21 April 2016.

No	Player	Position	Age	Previous club	Apps	Tries	Goals	DG	Points
1	Sam Tomkins	Fullback	N/A	New Zealand Warriors	0	0	0	0	0
2	Josh Charnley	Winger	N/A	Wigan Warriors Academy	11	7	5	0	38
3	Anthony Gelling	Centre	N/A	Auckland Vulcans	10	3	0	0	12
4	Dan Sarginson	Centre	N/A	London Broncos	13	2	0	0	8
5	Dominic Manfredi	Wing	N/A	Wigan Warriors Academy	10	8	0	0	32
6	George Williams	Stand off	N/A	Wigan Warriors Academy	4	2	0	0	8
7	Matty Smith	Scrum half	N/A	Salford Red Devils	13	2	30	4	72
8	Dom Crosby	Prop	N/A	Wigan Warriors Academy	1	0	0	0	0
9	Michael McIlorum	Hooker	N/A	Wigan Warriors Academy	3	2	0	0	8
10	Ben Flower	Prop	N/A	Crusaders	9	1	0	0	4
11	Joel Tomkins	Second row	N/A	Saracens (Rugby Union)	5	1	0	0	4
12	Liam Farrell	Second row	N/A	Wigan Warriors Academy	8	2	0	0	8
13	Sean O'Loughlin (c)	Loose forward	N/A	Wigan Warriors Academy	9	0	0	0	0
14	John Bateman	Second row	N/A	Bradford Bulls	11	5	0	0	20
15	Tony Clubb	Centre	N/A	London Broncos	13	1	0	0	4
16	Sam Powell	Scrum half	N/A	Wigan Warriors Academy	13	1	0	0	4
17	Lee Mossop	Prop	N/A	Parramatta Eels	10	0	0	0	0
18	Warriors Fans	-	-	-	-	-	-	-	-
19	Taulima Tautai	Loose forward	N/A	Wakefield Trinity Wildcats	13	0	0	0	0
20	Oliver Gildart	Centre	N/A	Wigan Warriors Academy	11	4	0	0	16
21	Ryan Sutton	Prop	N/A	Wigan Warriors Academy	13	0	0	0	0
22	Lewis Tierney	Fullback	N/A	Wigan Warriors Academy	9	2	0	0	8
23	Connor Farrell	Second row	N/A	Wigan Warriors Academy	0	0	0	0	0
24	Rhodri Lloyd	Prop	N/A	South Wales Scorpions	0	0	0	0	0
25	Willie Isa	Second row	N/A	Widnes Vikings	7	0	0	0	0
26	Greg Burke	Loose forward	N/A	Wigan Warriors Academy	10	0	0	0	0
27	Nick Gregson	Second row	N/A	Wigan Warriors Academy	8	1	0	0	4
28	Jake Shorrocks	Scrum half	N/A	Wigan Warriors Academy	0	0	0	0	0
29	Joe Bretherton	Prop	N/A	Wigan Warriors Academy	2	0	0	0	0
30	Jack Higginson	Centre	N/A	Wigan Warriors Academy	2	0	0	0	0
31	Gabriel Fell	Fullback	N/A	Wigan Warriors Academy	0	0	0	0	0
32	Luke Waterworth	Hooker	N/A	Wigan Warriors Academy	1	0	0	0	0
33	Jack Wells	Hooker	N/A	Wigan Warriors Academy	2	0	0	0	0

= Injured = Suspended

== Transfers ==
In

Player	Previous club	Contract	Date signed
(England) Sam Tomkins	New Zealand Warriors	4 Years	April 2015
(Samoa) Willie Isa	Widnes Vikings	2 Years	September 2015
(England) Greg Burke	Hull Kingston Rovers	Loan return	October 2015
(Wales) Rhodri Lloyd	Whitehaven	Loan return	October 2015

Out

Player	Signed for	Contract length	Date announced
(England) Joe Burgess	Sydney Roosters	3 Years	January 2015
(England) Scott Taylor	Hull F.C.	4 Years	May 2015
(England) Iain Thornley	Hull Kingston Rovers	2 Years	August 2015
(England) Jack Hughes	Warrington Wolves	2 Years	August 2015
(England) Jamie Doran	Workington Town	2 Years	September 2015
(Wales) Larne Patrick	Huddersfield Giants	Loan return	September 2015
(Australia) Matt Bowen	Retirement	N/A	October 2015
(England) James Greenwood	Hull Kingston Rovers	2 Years	October 2015
(England) Rob Lever	Swinton Lions	1 Year	October 2015
(England) Ryan Hampshire	Castleford Tigers	1 Year Loan	November 2015
(England) Logan Tomkins	Salford Red Devils	1 Year	November 2015
(England) Connor Farrell	Widnes Vikings	1 Year Loan	January 2016
