= John Bateman (rugby league) =

English rugby league footballer

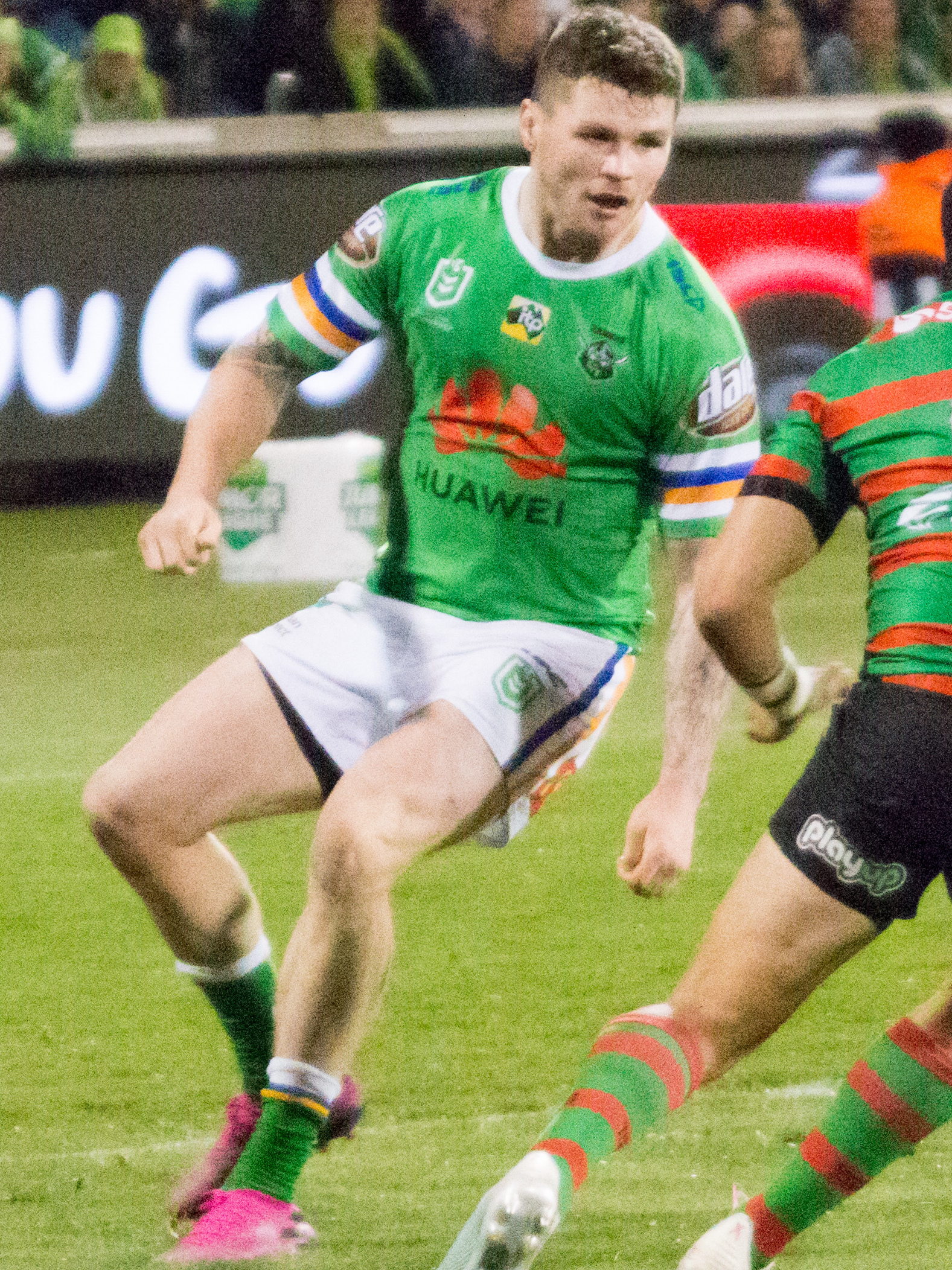

Personal information
- Full name: John Bateman
- Born: 30 September 1993 (age 33) Bradford, United Kingdom
- Height: 183 cm (6 ft 0 in)
- Weight: 96 kg (15 st 2 lb)

Playing information
- Position: Second-row, Loose forward, Centre
Club
Years	Team	Pld	T	G	FG	P
2011–13	Bradford Bulls	35	9	0	0	36
2014–18	Wigan Warriors	132	34	1	0	138
2019–20	Canberra Raiders	34	8	0	0	32
2021–22	Wigan Warriors	42	6	0	0	24
2023–24	Wests Tigers	32	2	0	0	8
2024(loan)	→ Warrington Wolves	10	1	0	0	4
2025–26	North Queensland Cowboys	26	2	0	0	8
2027–	Bradford Bulls	0	0	0	0	0
	Total	311	62	1	0	250
Representative
Years	Team	Pld	T	G	FG	P
2015–25	England	27	8	0	0	32
2019	Great Britain	4	1	0	0	4
- Source: As of 15 November 2026

John Bateman (born 30 September 1993) is an English professional rugby league footballer who plays as a second-row for the Bradford Bulls in the Super League, and England and Great Britain at international level.

He previously played for the Bradford, Wigan and Warrington in the Super League, and for the Canberra Raiders and Wests Tigers in the NRL. Earlier in his career, he played as a centre.

== Background ==
Bateman was born in Bradford, West Yorkshire, England. He is a product of the Bradford Dudley Hill amateur Rugby League club.

== Club career ==
=== Bradford ===
==== 2011 season ====
In April 2011, at the age of 17 years and 208 days old Bateman made his Super League début starting at Lock for the Bradford Bulls in an 8–8 draw against Catalans Dragons. In May 2011, he made his first Challenge Cup appearance for the club against Halifax. He made two more first-team appearances towards the end of the season and scored his first Super League try against Wigan Warriors.

==== 2012 season ====
Bateman featured in Round 1 (Catalans Dragons). He missed Rounds 2–3 due to injury. He featured in six consecutive games from Round 4 (Wakefield Trinity) to Round 9 (Hull F.C.). Bateman was suspended for rounds 10 and 11. John returned in Round 12 (Huddersfield Giants). Bateman was suspended for Rounds 13–14. He returned to play in six consecutive games from Round 15 (Leeds Rhinos) to Round 20 (London Broncos). Bateman missed Rounds 21–24 due to England Academy commitments. Bateman returned for Round 25 (Huddersfield Giants). John was injured in Rounds 26–27. He featured in the Challenge Cup against Doncaster and Warrington Wolves. Bateman scored against Hull F.C. (1 try), Doncaster (1 try) and Castleford Tigers (1 try).

In 2012 Bateman was awarded the Albert Goldthorpe Rookie of the Year Medal.

==== 2013 season ====
In the off-season, Bateman signed a 3 Year Extension on his current deal and this will keep him at Odsal until 2015.

He missed Rounds 1–6 due to an injury. He featured in four consecutive games from Round 7 (Hull Kingston Rovers) to Round 10 (Salford City Reds). John missed Round 11–12 due to an injury. He featured in Round 13 (Warrington Wolves) but was subject to a groin injury keeping him out of Round 14. John returned for Round 15 (Salford City Reds) but missed Round 16 but returned in Round 17 (Hull Kingston Rovers) to Round 22 (Hull F.C.). John missed the rest of the season due to surgery on his ankle. Bateman featured in the Challenge Cup against Rochdale Hornets and London Broncos. John scored against Hull Kingston Rovers (1 try), Catalans Dragons (1 try) Salford City Reds (1 try), Rochdale Hornets (1 try) and Wigan Warriors (1 try).

=== Wigan ===
In November 2013, Bateman signed a three-year contract with Wigan Warriors for an undisclosed fee, believed to be around £70,000.

==== 2014 ====
Bateman featured in the World Club Challenge against Sydney Roosters. He featured in Round 2 (Castleford Tigers) to Round 15 (Huddersfield Giants) then in Round 18 (St. Helens) to Round 23 (Salford City Reds). John next played in Round 25 (Widnes Vikings) to Round 27 (Warrington Wolves). Bateman played in Round 5 (Hunslet) to the Quarter Final (Castleford Tigers) in the Challenge Cup. John played in the Qualifying Playoff (Huddersfield Giants). He scored against Wakefield Trinity (1 try), the Bradford Bulls (1 try), Salford City Reds (1 try) and London Broncos (1 try).

==== 2015 ====
Bateman played in the World Club Series against Brisbane Broncos.

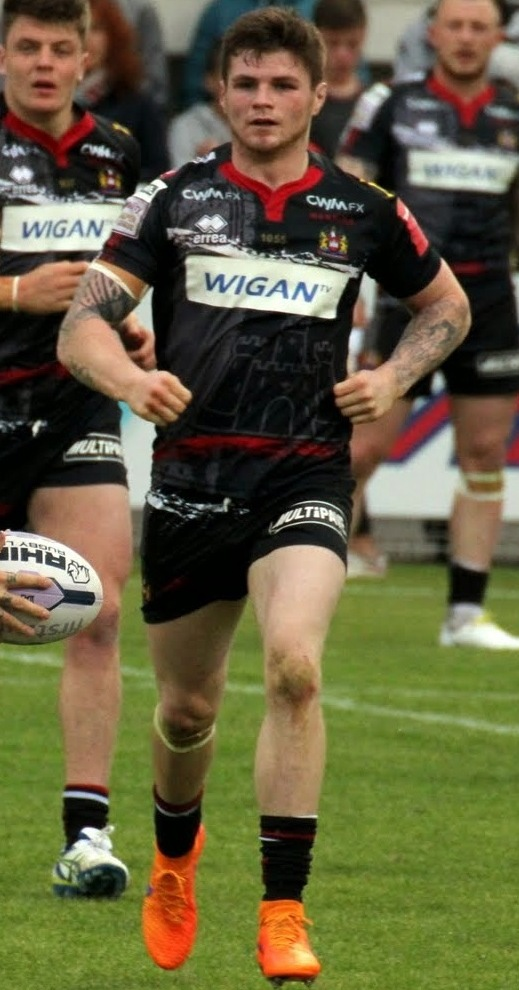
Bateman playing for Wigan in 2015

Bateman featured in Round 1 (Widnes Vikings) to Round 9 (Salford City Reds) then in Round 11 (Warrington Wolves) to Round 19 (Salford City Reds). He also played in Round 21 (Leeds Rhinos) to Super Eight 6 (St. Helens) then in the Semi Final (Huddersfield Giants) to the Grand Final (Leeds Rhinos). Bateman played in the Challenge Cup in Round 6 (Hull Kingston Rovers). He scored against Huddersfield Giants (4 tries), Hull F.C. (2 tries), Leeds Rhinos (1 try) and Warrington Wolves (2 tries).

He played in the 2015 Super League Grand Final defeat by the Leeds Rhinos at Old Trafford.

==== 2016 ====
Bateman featured in Round 1 (Catalans Dragons) to Round 8 (Hull Kingston Rovers) then in Round 11 (Castleford Tigers) to Round 12 (Huddersfield Giants). He featured in the World Club Series against Brisbane Broncos. He scored against Hull F.C. (1 try), Leeds Rhinos (1 try), Castleford Tigers (2 tries) and Huddersfield Giants (1 try). On 31 May 2016, Wigan confirmed they were investigating an "alleged fracas" between two Wigan players which took place outside of a gym on 27 May, and speculation grew that Bateman was linked to the controversy following his omission from the squad against Salford City Reds and Hull Kingston Rovers. On 15 June 2016, Bateman was fined £10,000 and suspended for eight weeks for his involvement in the incident.

He played in the 2016 Super League Grand Final victory over the Warrington Wolves at Old Trafford.

==== 2017 ====
He played in the 2017 Challenge Cup Final defeat by Hull F.C. at Wembley Stadium.

==== 2018 ====
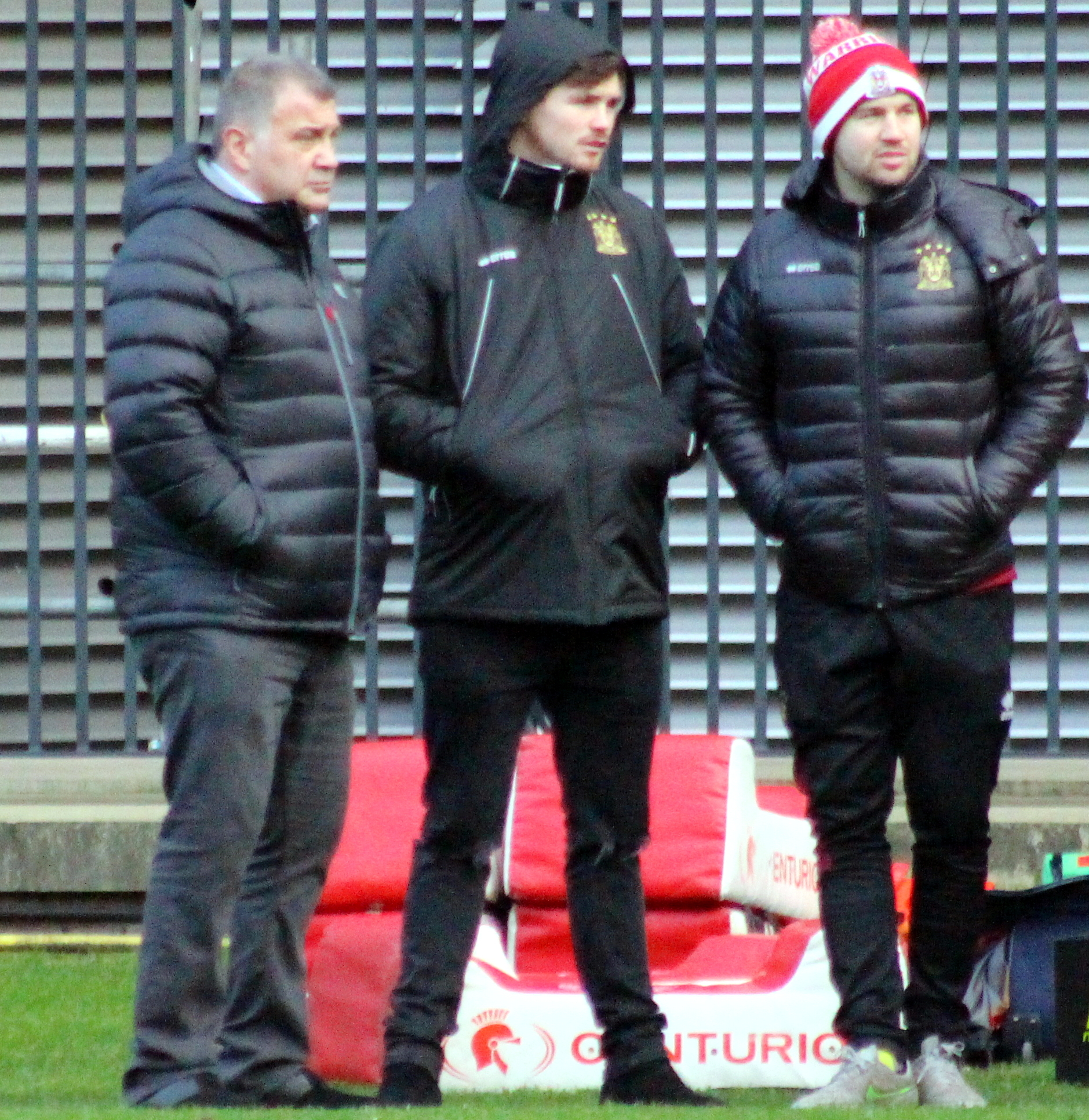
Shaun Wane, Bateman and Darrell Goulding at a Wigan match in 2018

He played in the 2018 Super League Grand Final victory over the Warrington Wolves at Old Trafford.

=== Canberra ===
==== 2019 ====
Bateman signed with the Canberra Raiders for 2019 and 2020, with a third-year option in his favour, on 8 August 2018. In round 19 of the 2019 NRL season against the Penrith Panthers, Bateman scored a try in the dying minutes to seal a 30–18 victory for the visitors away from home. The win cemented Canberra's position in the top 4 of the competition.

At the end of the 2019 regular season, Canberra finished 4th on the table and qualified for the finals. In the qualifying final against Melbourne, Bateman scored the winning try with just 3 minutes remaining. Canberra staged an upset victory at AAMI Park winning 12-10 and securing a home preliminary final. In the preliminary final against South Sydney, Bateman played at second-row as Canberra won the match 16–10 at Canberra Stadium and qualified for their first grand final in 25 years. On 2 October, Bateman was named as the 2019 Dally M second-rower of the year at the Dally M Awards ceremony.

Bateman played at second-row for Canberra in the 2019 NRL Grand Final as they were defeated 14–8 by the Sydney Roosters at ANZ Stadium.

==== 2020 ====
In February, it was revealed that Bateman would miss the first six weeks of the 2020 NRL season after undergoing shoulder surgery. On 31 June, it was announced that he would be departing the Canberra Raiders at the end of the season, With NRL Club, the Canterbury-Bankstown Bulldogs And His former side, The Wigan Warriors interested in his services.

Bateman played 11 games for Canberra in the 2020 NRL season. He featured in all three of Canberra's finals matches, including Melbourne's preliminary final loss. After the game had concluded, a visibly emotional Bateman thanked everyone at Canberra and stated it would be hard to leave the club.

==== 2021 ====
In August 2021, it was revealed that Bateman had been involved in a fistfight with then-Canberra player Curtis Scott. The incident was not reported to the police and the matter was sorted behind closed doors but the story came to light after Scott's termination by the Canberra club.

=== Re-Joining Wigan ===
In July 2020, it was announced that Bateman would rejoin Wigan for the 2021 season.

==== 2021 ====
In round 20 of the 2021 Super League season, Bateman was sent to the sin bin twice in Wigan's 26–2 loss against St Helens.

==== 2022 ====
In the 2022 semi-final, Bateman was sent off for a dangerous high tackle on former teammate Aiden Sezer during the club's shock defeat to Leeds.

=== Wests Tigers ===
On 26 December, Bateman left Wigan to sign a four-year deal with the NRL club Wests Tigers for 2023. In round 3 of the 2023 NRL season, Bateman made his long-awaited club debut for the Wests Tigers in their 26–22 loss against Canterbury at Belmore Sports Ground. He played in 20 games, leading Wests Tigers in offloads, with the 14th most in the NRL. He also led the club in tackles made. The club would finish bottom of the table in 2023 and claim their second Wooden Spoon. On 14 May 2024, it was announced that Bateman would miss up to 8–10 weeks with a pectoral injury which he suffered during the clubs narrow loss to Newcastle in round 10 of the 2024 NRL season. On 23 July 2024, Bateman joined the Warrington Wolves on loan for the remainder of the 2024 season.

==== Warrington Wolves (loan) ====
On 24 July 2024 it was reported that he had signed for Warrington in the Super League on season-long loan.

=== North Queensland Cowboys ===
On 18 December 2024, Bateman was released by the Wests Tigers, signing a two-year contract with the North Queensland Cowboys. Bateman played 19 matches for North Queensland in the 2025 NRL season as the club finished 12th on the table. Bateman was limited to just seven appearances for North Queensland in the 2026 NRL season as the club finished 8th on the table. Bateman played in the clubs elimination finals loss to Cronulla.

=== Bradford Bulls (re-join) ===
On 4 August 2026 it was reported that he had signed for Bradford Bulls in the Super League on a 2-year deal.

== International career ==
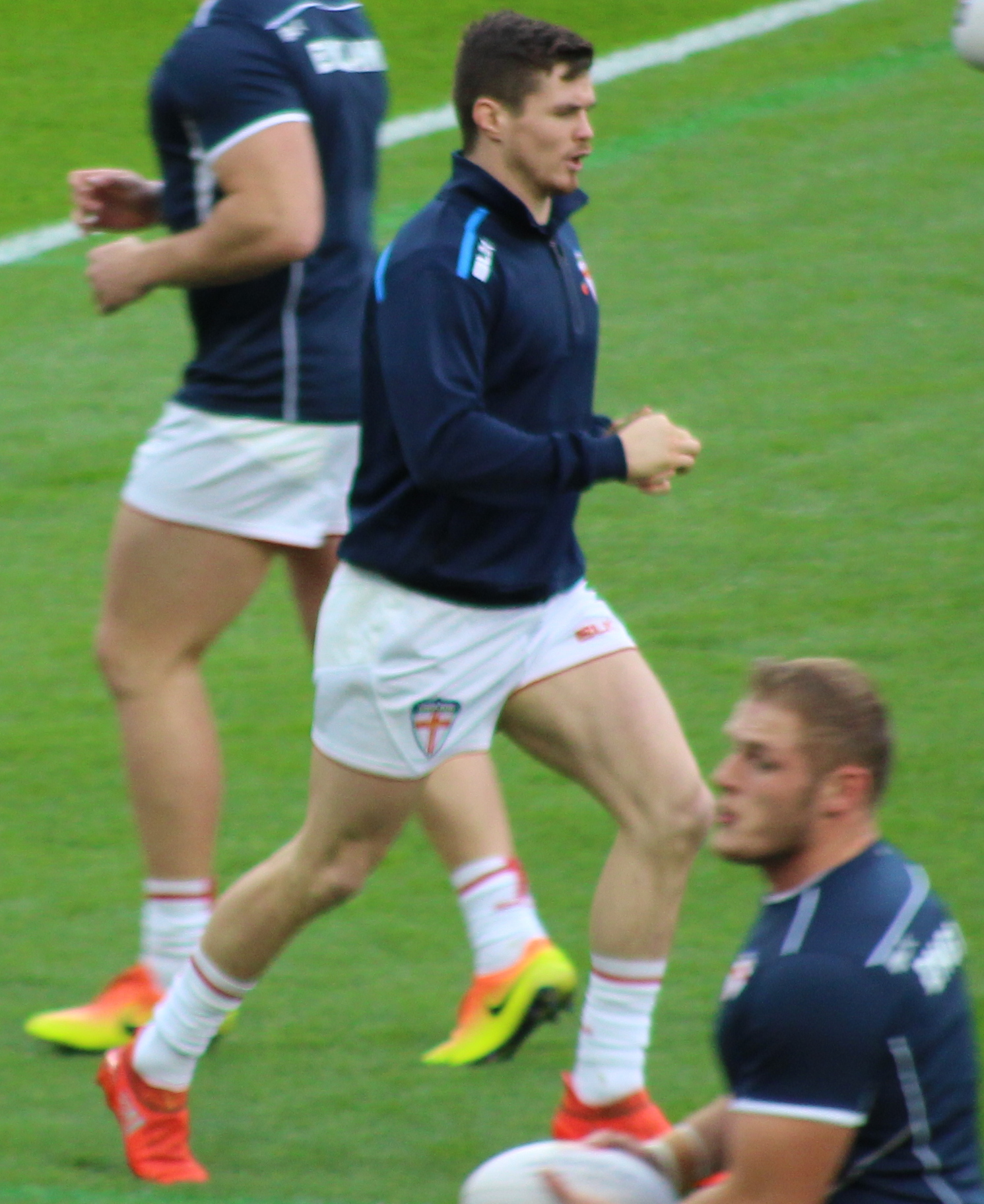
Bateman warming up for England in 2016

In 2012, Bateman was named captain of the England Academy squad to tour Australia.

Bateman made his England test début against France in October 2015.

After an outstanding Super League 2015 season, Bateman was selected in the senior England team for their test series against New Zealand. Bateman made his début for England in a test match, before the series, against France which saw Bateman score two tries in England's rout of their opponents. For his outstanding efforts in the game, Bateman was awarded man-of-the-match.

In October 2016, Bateman was selected in the England 24-man squad for the 2016 Four Nations.

In October 2017 he was selected in the England squad for the 2017 Rugby League World Cup.

He was selected in squad for the 2019 Great Britain Lions tour of the Southern Hemisphere. He made his Great Britain test debut in the defeat by Tonga.

== Statistics ==
Season	Team	Apps	Tries	Goals	DG	Points
2011	Bradford Bulls	4	1	0	0	4
2012	Bradford Bulls	17	3	0	0	12
2013	Bradford Bulls	14	5	0	0	20
2014	Wigan Warriors	29	4	0	0	16
2015	Wigan Warriors	31	9	0	0	36
2016	Wigan Warriors	27	13	0	0	52
2017	Wigan Warriors	16	5	0	0	20
2018	Wigan Warriors	29	1	0	0	16
2019	Canberra Raiders	23	5			20
2020	Canberra Raiders	11	3			12
2021	Wigan Warriors	20	3			
2022	Wigan Warriors	22	2			
2023	Wests Tigers	20	2			8
2024	Wests Tigers	12				
2024	Warrington Wolves (loan)	10	1			4
2025	North Queensland Cowboys	19	1			4
2026	North Queensland Cowboys					
2027	Bradford Bulls					
	Totals	304	60	0		238

== Honours ==
=== Wigan Warriors ===
- Super League
  - Winners (2): 2016, 2018
- Challenge Cup
  - Winners (1): 2022
- World Club Challenge
  - Winners (1): 2017

=== Individual ===
- Wigan Warriors Player of the Year
  - Winners (3): 2015, 2016 2018
