= 2017 Wigan Warriors season =

Rugby league team season

Wigan Warriors 2017 season
- Super League XXII Rank: 6th
- Play-off result: Did not qualify
- Challenge Cup: Runners-up
- 2017 record: Wins: 17; draws: 3; losses: 14
- Points scored: For: 691; against: 668

Team information
- Chairman: Ian Lenagan
- Head Coach: Shaun Wane
- Captain: Sean O'Loughlin
- Stadium: DW Stadium

Top scorers
- Tries: Joe Burgess (26)
- Points: George Williams (153)
← 2016	List of seasons	2018 →

The Wigan Warriors play Rugby League in Wigan, England. Their 2017 season results in the Super League XXII, 2017 Challenge Cup, and 2017 World Club Series are shown below.

== World Club Challenge ==
As winners of the 2016 Super League Grand Final, Wigan Warriors qualified for the 2017 World Club Series. The game saw them play Cronulla-Sutherland Sharks whom they beat providing the Super League's first ever win in the World Club Series era of the tournament.

Date	Opponent	H/A	Result	Scorers	Att.
19 February 2017	Cronulla-Sutherland Sharks	H	22–6		21,011

== Super League ==
Wigan's Super League form was relatively poor during the 2017 season. The year was the first time they had lost ten more games since 2009, and the first time they had failed to qualify for the play-offs since 2006.

=== Regular season ===
==== Matches ====
Date	Opponent	H/A	Result	Scorers	Att.	Pos.
11 February 2017	Salford Red Devils	A	26–16		6,527	
22 February 2017	Widnes Vikings	A	28–16		6,561	
3 March 2017	Leigh Centurions	H	20–0		15,699	
9 March 2017	Warrington Wolves	A	38–16		11,250	
18 March 2017	Huddersfield Giants	H	16–16		12,704	
24 March 2017	Hull FC	H	20–22		12,319	
31 March 2017	Leeds Rhinos	A	18–26		17,030	
6 April 2017	Castleford Tigers	H	10–27		12,423	
14 April 2017	St Helens	H	29–18		23,390	
17 April 2017	Wakefield Trinity	A	16–10		4,640	
23 April 2017	Catalans Dragons	H	42–22		11,637	
29 April 2017	Castleford Tigers	H	4–54		9,333	
5 May 2017	Salford Red Devils	H	16–31		11,861	
20 May 2017	Warrington Wolves	N	24–24		35,361	
25 May 2017	St Helens	A	19–22		13,138	
29 May 2019	Wakefield Trinity	H	30–42		13,110	
3 June 2017	Wakefield Trinity	H	26–39		10,333	
8 June 2017	Leigh Centurions	A	34–50		7,080	
23 June 2017	Huddersfield Giants	A	16–16		5,718	
2 July 2017	Widnes Vikings	H	28–12		12,758	
8 July 2017	Catalans Dragons	A	32–10		9,810	
13 July 2017	Warrington Wolves	H	10–16		12,790	
21 July 2017	Leeds Rhinos	H	34–0		15,119	

==== Table ====
Pos	Team	Pld	W	D	L	PF	PA	PD	Pts	Qualification
1	Castleford Tigers	23	20	0	3	769	378	+391	40	Super League Super 8s
2	Leeds Rhinos	23	15	0	8	553	477	+76	30	Super League Super 8s
3	Hull F.C.	23	13	1	9	541	483	+58	27	Super League Super 8s
4	Salford Red Devils	23	13	0	10	576	500	+76	26	Super League Super 8s
5	Wakefield Trinity	23	13	0	10	572	509	+63	26	Super League Super 8s
6	St. Helens	23	12	1	10	516	420	+96	25	Super League Super 8s
7	Wigan Warriors	23	10	3	10	539	518	+21	23	Super League Super 8s
8	Huddersfield Giants	23	9	3	11	519	486	+33	21	Super League Super 8s
9	Warrington Wolves	23	9	2	12	426	557	−131	20	The Qualifiers
10	Catalans Dragons	23	7	1	15	469	689	−220	15	The Qualifiers
11	Leigh Centurions	23	6	0	17	425	615	−190	12	The Qualifiers
12	Widnes Vikings	23	5	1	17	359	632	−273	11	The Qualifiers

Source: Rugby League Project
Rules for classification: 1) Points; 2) Points difference; 3) Number of points scored;

=== Super 8s ===
==== Matches ====
Date	Opponent	H/A	Result	Scorers	Att.	Pos.
4 August 2017	Leeds Rhinos	A	16–32		13,579	
11 August 2017	Huddersfield Giants	H	18–14		10,619	
18 August 2017	Salford Red Devils	H	42–6		11,229	
1 September 2017	St Helens	A	25–10		15,248	
8 September 2017	Hull F.C.	A	30–22		11,291	
17 September 2017	Castleford Tigers	H	20–38		15,706	
23 September 2017	Wakefield Trinity	A	0–32		5,155	

==== Table ====
Pos	Team	Pld	W	D	L	PF	PA	PD	Pts	Qualification
1	Castleford Tigers (L)	30	25	0	5	965	536	+429	50	Semi-finals
2	Leeds Rhinos (C)	30	20	0	10	749	623	+126	40	Semi-finals
3	Hull F.C.	30	17	1	12	714	655	+59	35	Semi-finals
4	St Helens	30	16	1	13	663	518	+145	33	Semi-finals
5	Wakefield Trinity	30	16	0	14	714	679	+35	32	
6	Wigan Warriors	30	14	3	13	691	668	+23	31	
7	Salford Red Devils	30	14	0	16	680	728	−48	28	
8	Huddersfield Giants	30	11	3	16	663	680	−17	25	

(C) Champions; (L) League Leaders Shield

== Challenge Cup ==
As a "Super 8s" team of the 2016 Super League, Wigan Warriors entered the 2017 Challenge Cup in the sixth round where they beat Championship's Swinton Lions. The quarter finals saw them beat local rivals Warrington Wolves by a single point. In the semi-finals Warriors beat Salford Red Devils, before finishing runners-up at Wembley to Hull F.C. The final was their first final since 2013.

Date	Round	Opponent	H/A	Result	Scorers	Att.
14 May 2017	Sixth Round	Swinton Lions	A	42–12		2,003
17 June 2017	Quarter Final	Warrington Wolves	A	27–26		7,312
30 July 2017	Semi Final	Salford Red Devils	N	27–14		10,796
26 August 2017	Final	Hull F.C.	N	14–18		68,525
