= 2017 Super League season =

22nd season of the Super League

Super League XXII
- League: Super League
- Duration: 30 Rounds
- Teams: 12
- Highest attendance: 23,390; Wigan Warriors vs St Helens (14 April)
- Lowest attendance: 2,678 Salford Red Devils Vs Hull F.C. (9 June)
- Average attendance: 8,568
- Total attendance: 1,182,437
- Broadcast partners: Sky Sports; BBC Sport; Fox League beIN Sports; Fox Soccer Plus; Sport Klub

2017 season
- Champions: Leeds Rhinos; 8th Super League; 11th British title
- League Leaders: Castleford Tigers
- Runners-up: Castleford Tigers
- Biggest home win: Castleford Tigers 66–10 Leeds Rhinos (2 March)
- Biggest away win: Catalans Dragons 12–56 Huddersfield Giants (10 June)
- Man of Steel: (England) Luke Gale
- Top try-scorer: (England) Greg Eden (38)

Promotion and relegation
- Promoted from Championship: Hull Kingston Rovers
- Relegated to Championship: Leigh Centurions

The Betfred Super League XXII, was the year 2017 Super League season and 123rd season of rugby league in Britain.

Super League XXII featured twelve teams, the third year in which this number has taken part. This was also the third year since promotion and relegation was reintroduced into the competition, seeing Leigh promoted and Hull KR relegated from last season.

== Teams ==
Eleven teams in Super League are from the North of England. Six teams hail from the historic county of Lancashire, west of the Pennines: Warrington, St. Helens, Salford, Wigan, Leigh, and Widnes. Five teams hail from the historic county of Yorkshire, east of the Pennines: Huddersfield, Wakefield Trinity, Leeds, Castleford, and Hull F.C. Catalans Dragons, located in Perpignan, France, are the only team outside the North of England. St Helens, Wigan Warriors, Warrington Wolves, and Leeds Rhinos are the only teams to have played in every season of Super League since 1996.

Leigh were promoted from the Kingstone Press Championship after finishing in 2nd place in The Qualifiers for 2016. Leigh became the first club promoted to the Super League under the Super 8s system, and the first club promoted to Super League since Widnes received a license for Super League XVII. Leigh last competed in the top flight in Super League X. Hull Kingston Rovers were relegated to the Championship after losing the 2016 Million Pound Game to Salford.

Locations of Super League XXII teams
Locations of Super League XXII teams
Locations of Super League XXII teams in West Yorkshire
Locations of Super League XXII teams in Greater Manchester

Team	2016 position	Stadium	Capacity	City/Area
Castleford Tigers (2017 season)	5th	The Mend-O-Hose Jungle	11,750	Castleford, West Yorkshire
Catalans Dragons (2017 season)	6th	Stade Gilbert Brutus	14,000	Perpignan, Pyrénées-Orientales, France
Huddersfield Giants (2017 season)	12th	John Smith's Stadium	24,544	Huddersfield, West Yorkshire
Hull (2017 season)	3rd	KCOM Stadium	25,404	Kingston upon Hull, East Riding of Yorkshire
Leigh Centurions (2017 season)	Promoted	Leigh Sports Village	12,700	Leigh, Greater Manchester
Leeds Rhinos (2017 season)	9th	Headingley Carnegie Stadium	22,250	Leeds, West Yorkshire
Salford Red Devils (2017 season)	10th	AJ Bell Stadium	12,000	Salford, Greater Manchester
St. Helens (2017 season)	4th	Totally Wicked Stadium	18,000	St. Helens, Merseyside
Wakefield Trinity (2017 season)	8th	Beaumont Legal Stadium	11,000	Wakefield, West Yorkshire
Warrington Wolves (2017 season)	1st	Halliwell Jones Stadium	15,500	Warrington, Cheshire
Widnes Vikings (2017 season)	7th	The Select Security Stadium	13,500	Widnes, Cheshire
Wigan Warriors (2017 season)	2nd (Champions)	DW Stadium	25,138	Wigan, Greater Manchester

== Regular season ==
=== Standings at end of regular season ===
Pos	Team	Pld	W	D	L	PF	PA	PD	Pts	Qualification
1	Castleford Tigers	23	20	0	3	769	378	+391	40	Super League Super 8s
2	Leeds Rhinos	23	15	0	8	553	477	+76	30	Super League Super 8s
3	Hull F.C.	23	13	1	9	541	483	+58	27	Super League Super 8s
4	Salford Red Devils	23	13	0	10	576	500	+76	26	Super League Super 8s
5	Wakefield Trinity	23	13	0	10	572	509	+63	26	Super League Super 8s
6	St. Helens	23	12	1	10	516	420	+96	25	Super League Super 8s
7	Wigan Warriors	23	10	3	10	539	518	+21	23	Super League Super 8s
8	Huddersfield Giants	23	9	3	11	519	486	+33	21	Super League Super 8s
9	Warrington Wolves	23	9	2	12	426	557	−131	20	The Qualifiers
10	Catalans Dragons	23	7	1	15	469	689	−220	15	The Qualifiers
11	Leigh Centurions	23	6	0	17	425	615	−190	12	The Qualifiers
12	Widnes Vikings	23	5	1	17	359	632	−273	11	The Qualifiers

Source: Rugby League Project
Rules for classification: 1) Points; 2) Points difference; 3) Number of points scored;

== Super 8s ==
=== Super League ===
Pos	Team	Pld	W	D	L	PF	PA	PD	Pts	Qualification
1	Castleford Tigers (L)	30	25	0	5	965	536	+429	50	Semi-finals
2	Leeds Rhinos (C)	30	20	0	10	749	623	+126	40	Semi-finals
3	Hull F.C.	30	17	1	12	714	655	+59	35	Semi-finals
4	St Helens	30	16	1	13	663	518	+145	33	Semi-finals
5	Wakefield Trinity	30	16	0	14	714	679	+35	32	
6	Wigan Warriors	30	14	3	13	691	668	+23	31	
7	Salford Red Devils	30	14	0	16	680	728	−48	28	
8	Huddersfield Giants	30	11	3	16	663	680	−17	25	

(C) Champions; (L) League Leaders Shield

=== The Qualifiers ===
Pos	Team	Pld	W	D	L	PF	PA	PD	Pts	Qualification
1	Warrington Wolves	7	7	0	0	288	138	+150	14	Super League XXIII
2	Widnes Vikings	7	5	0	2	188	96	+92	10	Super League XXIII
3	Hull Kingston Rovers (P)	7	5	0	2	166	158	+8	10	Super League XXIII
4	Leigh Centurions (R)	7	4	0	3	203	104	+99	8	Million Pound Game
5	Catalans Dragons	7	4	0	3	130	143	−13	8	Million Pound Game
6	London Broncos	7	1	1	5	174	220	−46	3	2018 Championship
7	Featherstone Rovers	7	1	1	5	110	272	−162	3	2018 Championship
8	Halifax	7	0	0	7	82	210	−128	0	2018 Championship

(P) Promoted to Super League; (R) Relegated

== Playoffs ==
=== Super League ===
#	Home	Score	Away	Match Information
#	Home	Score	Away	Date and Time (Local)	Venue	Referee	Attendance
Semi-finals
SF1	Castleford Tigers	23–22 (Note: After extra time)	St. Helens	28 September 2017, 19:45 BST	Mend-A-Hose Jungle	James Child	11,235
SF2	Leeds Rhinos	18–16	Hull	29 September 2017, 19:45 BST	Headingley Carnegie	Phil Bentham	12,500
Grand final
F	Castleford Tigers	6–24	Leeds Rhinos	7 October 2017, 18:00 BST	Old Trafford	James Child	72,827

=== Million Pound Game ===
Home	Score	Away	Match Information
Home	Score	Away	Date and Time	Venue	Referee	Attendance
Leigh Centurions	10–26	Catalans Dragons	30 September 2017, 15:00	Leigh Sports Village	Ben Thaler	6,888

== Player statistics ==
=== Top try scorers ===
Rank	Player	Club	Tries
1	(England) Greg Eden	Castleford Tigers	38
2	(England) Liam Marshall	Wigan Warriors	21
3	(England) Ben Jones-Bishop	Wakefield Trinity	20
4=	(England) Greg Minikin	Castleford Tigers	19
4=	(England) Jermaine McGillvary	Huddersfield Giants	19
4=	(Australia) Albert Kelly	Hull	19
7	(England) Joe Burgess	Wigan Warriors	18
8=	(Australia) Matt Parcell	Leeds Rhinos	17
8=	(England) Mason Caton-Brown	Wakefield Trinity	17
8=	(England) Jamie Shaul	Hull	17

=== Top goalscorers ===
Rank	Player	Club	Goals
1	(England) Luke Gale	Castleford Tigers	129
2	(England) Marc Sneyd	Hull	103
3	(Republic of Ireland) Liam Finn	Wakefield Trinity	96
4	(England) Mark Percival	St. Helens	95
5	(Australia) Luke Walsh	Catalans	69
6	(Scotland) Danny Brough	Huddersfield Giants	61
7	(England) Ben Reynolds	Leigh Centurions	48
8	(Australia) Michael Dobson	Salford Red Devils	46
9=	(England) Liam Sutcliffe	Leeds Rhinos	45
9=	(England) Gareth O'Brien	Salford Red Devils	45
9=	(England) Kallum Watkins	Leeds Rhinos	45

=== Top try assists ===
Rank	Player	Club	Assists
1	(England) George Williams	Wigan Warriors	29
2	(England) Danny McGuire	Leeds Rhinos	24
3	(Australia) Robert Lui	Salford Red Devils	23
4	(Scotland) Danny Brough	Huddersfield Giants	22
5=	(Australia) Luke Walsh	Catalans Dragons	20
5=	(England) Luke Gale	Castleford Tigers	20
7=	(England) Paul McShane	Castleford Tigers	19
7=	(England) Michael Shenton	Castleford Tigers	19
9=	(England) Zak Hardaker	Castleford Tigers	18
9=	(England) Marc Sneyd	Hull	18

=== Top points scorers ===
Rank	Player	Club	Points
1	(England) Luke Gale	Castleford Tigers	317
2	(England) Mark Percival	St. Helens	254
3	(England) Marc Sneyd	Hull	237
4	(Republic of Ireland) Liam Finn	Wakefield Trinity	196
5=	(England) Greg Eden	Castleford Tigers	152
5=	(England) Kallum Watkins	Leeds Rhinos	152
7	(Australia) Luke Walsh	Catalans Dragons	150
8	(Scotland) Danny Brough	Huddersfield Giants	141
9	(England) George Williams	Wigan Warriors	131
10	(England) Gareth O'Brien	Salford Red Devils	124

== Attendances ==
=== Average attendances ===
Club	Home Games	Total	Average	Highest	Lowest
Castleford Tigers	11	104,776	9,525	11,500	7,094
Catalans Dragons	11	96,551	8,777	10,804	7,254
Huddersfield Giants	11	64,081	5,826	8,666	4,973
Hull	11	128,900	11,718	15,487	10,222
Leeds Rhinos	11	164,449	14,950	18,029	13,169
Leigh Centurions	11	71,732	6,521	9,012	4,938
Salford Red Devils	11	51,736	4,703	6,253	2,678
St Helens	11	118,240	10,749	13,138	9,040
Wakefield Trinity	11	58,178	5,289	7,187	4,017
Warrington Wolves	11	115,253	10,478	11,681	9,152
Widnes Vikings	11	63,437	5,767	8,279	4,253
Wigan Warriors	11	153,810	13,983	23,390	11,637

=== Top 10 attendances ===
Rank	Home club	Away club	Stadium	Attendance
1	Magic Weekend: Day 1		St. James' Park	35,361
2	Magic Weekend: Day 2		St. James' Park	30,046
3	Wigan Warriors	St Helens	DW Stadium	23,390
4	Leeds Rhinos	Castleford Tigers	Headingley Stadium	18,029
5	Leeds Rhinos	Wigan Warriors	Headingley Stadium	17,030
6	Leeds Rhinos	Hull	Headingley Stadium	16,938
7	Wigan Warriors	Leigh Centurions	DW Stadium	15,699
8	Hull	Leeds Rhinos	KCOM Stadium	15,487
9	Leeds Rhinos	Widnes Vikings	Headingley Stadium	15,408
10	Wigan Warriors	Leeds Rhinos	DW Stadium	15,119

- Statistics correct as of 23 July 2017 (round 23)

== End-of-season awards ==
Awards are presented for outstanding contributions and efforts to players and clubs in the week leading up to the Super League Grand Final:

- Man of Steel: Luke Gale - Castleford Tigers
- Coach of the year: Daryl Powell - Castleford Tigers
- Super League club of the year: Castleford Tigers
- Young player of the year: Oliver Gildart - Wigan Warriors
- Foundation of the year: Wigan Warriors
- Rhino "Top Gun": Marc Sneyd - Hull F.C. (89% - 103 goals)
- Metre-maker: Alex Walmsley - St. Helens (4256 metres)
- Top Try Scorer: Greg Eden (38) - Castleford Tigers
- Hit Man: Danny Houghton - Hull F.C. (1123 tackles)
- Outstanding Contribution:
  Thomas Bosc - Catalans Dragons
  Chris Bridge - Warrington Wolves
  Rob Burrow - Leeds Rhinos
  Eorl Crabtree - Huddersfield Giants
  Gareth Ellis - Hull
  Andy Lynch - Castleford Tigers
  Leon Pryce - Bradford Bulls
  Iafeta Paleaaesina - Hull

== Media ==
=== Television ===
2017 is the first of a five-year contract with Sky Sports to televise 100 matches per season.

Sky Sports coverage in the UK will see two live matches broadcast each week, usually at 8:00 pm on Thursday and Friday nights.

Regular commentators will be Eddie Hemmings with summarisers including Phil Clarke, Brian Carney, Barrie McDermott and Terry O'Connor. Sky will broadcast highlights on Sunday nights on Super League - Full Time at 10 p.m.

BBC Sport will broadcast a highlights programme called the Super League Show, presented by Tanya Arnold. The BBC show two weekly broadcasts of the programme, the first to the BBC North West, Yorkshire, North East and Cumbria, and East Yorkshire and Lincolnshire regions on Monday evenings at 11:35 p.m. on BBC One, while a repeat showing is shown nationally on BBC Two on Tuesday afternoons at 1.30 p.m. The Super League Show is also available for one week after broadcast for streaming or download via the BBC iPlayer in the UK only. End of season play-offs are shown on BBC Two across the whole country in a weekly highlights package on Sunday afternoons.

Internationally, Super League is shown live or delayed on Showtime Sports (Middle East), Sky Sport (New Zealand), TV 2 Sport (Norway), Fox Soccer Plus (United States), Fox Sports (Australia) and Sportsnet World (Canada).

=== Radio ===
BBC Coverage:

- BBC Radio 5 Live Sports Extra (National DAB Digital Radio) will carry two Super League commentaries each week on Thursday and Friday nights (both kick off 8pm); this will be through the 5 Live Rugby league programme which is presented by Dave Woods with a guest summariser (usually a Super League player or coach) and also includes interviews and debate..
- BBC Radio Humberside will have full match commentary of all Hull F.C. matches.
- BBC Radio Leeds carry commentaries featuring Leeds, Castleford, Wakefield and Huddersfield.
- BBC Radio Manchester will carry commentary of Leigh, Wigan and Salford whilst sharing commentary of Warrington with BBC Radio Merseyside.
- BBC Radio Merseyside will have commentary on St Helens and Widnes matches whilst sharing commentary of Warrington with BBC Radio Manchester.

Commercial Radio Coverage:

- 102.4 Wish FM will carry commentaries of Wigan & St Helens matches.
- 107.2 Wire FM will carry commentaries on Warrington Home and Away.
- Radio Yorkshire will launch in March carrying Super League commentaries.
- Radio Warrington (Online Station) all Warrington home games and some away games.
- Grand Sud FM covers every Catalans Dragons Home Match (in French).
- Radio France Bleu Roussillon covers every Catalans Dragons Away Match (in French).

All Super League commentaries on any station are available via the particular stations on-line streaming.
