= 2016 Super League season =

British rugby league season

Super League XXI
- League: Super League
- Duration: 30 Rounds
- Teams: 12
- Highest attendance: 20,049; Wigan Warriors vs St Helens (22 July)
- Lowest attendance: 1,958; Salford Red Devils vs Huddersfield Giants (18 June)
- Average attendance: 9,134
- Total attendance: 1,260,474 (as of round 23)
- Broadcast partners: Sky Sports; BBC Sport; Fox Sports beIN Sports; Fox Soccer Plus; Sport Klub

2016 season
- Champions: Wigan Warriors; 4th Super League; 21st British title
- League Leaders: Warrington Wolves
- Runners-up: Hull FC
- Biggest home win: Wakefield Trinity Wildcats 62 – 0 Wigan Warriors (Sunday 10 April 2016)
- Biggest away win: Castleford Tigers 16 – 58 Hull Kingston Rovers (Sunday 24 April 2016)
- Man of Steel: (England) Danny Houghton
- Top try-scorer: (Australia) Denny Solomona (40)

Promotion and relegation
- Promoted from Championship: Leigh Centurions
- Relegated to Championship: Hull Kingston Rovers

Super League XXI, known as the First Utility Super League XXI for sponsor reasons, was the 21st season of the Super League and 122nd season of rugby league in Britain for 2016.

Twelve teams competed over 23 rounds, including the Magic Weekend. Wigan Warriors were the Champions after successfully defeating Warrington Wolves 12–6 at Old Trafford, while Leigh Centurions were promoted from the Championship via The Qualifiers while Hull KR were relegated after losing to Salford Red Devils in the Million Pound Game.

== Teams ==
Super League XXI features twelve teams, the second year in which this number has taken part. This is also the second year since promotion and relegation was reintroduced into the competition although there has been no change in teams for 2016.

Eleven teams in Super League are from the North of England: five teams, Warrington, St. Helens, Salford, Wigan and Widnes, west of the Pennines in the historic county of Lancashire and six teams, Huddersfield, Wakefield Trinity, Leeds, Castleford, Hull F.C. and Hull Kingston Rovers, to the east in Yorkshire. Catalans Dragons, in Perpignan, France, are the only team outside the North of England. St Helens, Wigan Warriors, Warrington Wolves and Leeds Rhinos as the only teams to have played in every season of Super League since 1996.

Team	2015 position	Stadium	Capacity	City/Area
Castleford Tigers (2016 season)	5th	The Mend-O-Hose Jungle	11,750	Castleford, West Yorkshire
Catalans Dragons (2016 season)	8th	Stade Gilbert Brutus	14,000	Perpignan, Pyrénées-Orientales, France
Huddersfield Giants (2016 season)	3rd	John Smith's Stadium	24,544	Huddersfield, West Yorkshire
Hull F.C. (2016 season)	7th	Kingston Communications Stadium	25,404	Kingston upon Hull, East Riding of Yorkshire
Hull Kingston Rovers (2016 season)	9th	KC Lightstream Stadium	12,225	Kingston upon Hull, East Riding of Yorkshire
Leeds Rhinos (2016 season)	1st	Headingley Carnegie Stadium	22,250	Leeds, West Yorkshire
Salford Red Devils (2016 season)	11th	AJ Bell Stadium	12,000	Salford, Greater Manchester
St Helens R.F.C. (2016 season)	4th	Langtree Park	18,000	St. Helens, Merseyside
Wakefield Trinity Wildcats (2016 season)	12th	Rapid Solicitors Stadium	11,000	Wakefield, West Yorkshire
Warrington Wolves (2016 season)	6th	Halliwell Jones Stadium	15,500	Warrington, Cheshire
Widnes Vikings (2016 season)	10th	The Select Security Stadium	13,500	Widnes, Cheshire
Wigan Warriors (2016 season)	2nd	DW Stadium	25,138	Wigan, Greater Manchester

== Regular season ==
Pos	Team	Pld	W	D	L	PF	PA	PD	Pts	Qualification
1	Hull F.C.	23	17	0	6	605	465	+140	34	Super League Super 8s
2	Warrington Wolves	23	16	1	6	675	425	+250	33	Super League Super 8s
3	Wigan Warriors	23	16	0	7	455	440	+15	32	Super League Super 8s
4	St Helens	23	14	0	9	573	536	+37	28	Super League Super 8s
5	Catalans Dragons	23	13	0	10	593	505	+88	26	Super League Super 8s
6	Castleford Tigers	23	10	1	12	617	640	−23	21	Super League Super 8s
7	Widnes Vikings	23	10	0	13	499	474	+25	20	Super League Super 8s
8	Wakefield Trinity Wildcats	23	10	0	13	485	654	−169	20	Super League Super 8s
9	Leeds Rhinos	23	8	0	15	404	576	−172	16	The Qualifiers
10	Salford Red Devils	23	10	0	13	560	569	−9	14 (Note: Salford deducted 6 points for salary cap breaches in 2014 and 2015.)	The Qualifiers
11	Hull Kingston Rovers	23	6	2	15	486	610	−124	14	The Qualifiers
12	Huddersfield Giants	23	6	0	17	511	569	−58	12	The Qualifiers

Source: Rugby League Project
Rules for classification: 1) Points; 2) Points difference; 3) Number of points scored;

== Super 8s ==
=== Super League ===
Pos	Team	Pld	W	D	L	PF	PA	PD	Pts	Qualification
1	Warrington Wolves (L)	30	21	1	8	852	541	+311	43	Semi-finals
2	Wigan Warriors (C)	30	21	0	9	669	560	+109	42	Semi-finals
3	Hull F.C.	30	20	0	10	749	579	+170	40	Semi-finals
4	St Helens	30	20	0	10	756	641	+115	40	Semi-finals
5	Castleford Tigers	30	15	1	14	830	808	+22	31	
6	Catalans Dragons	30	15	0	15	723	716	+7	30	
7	Widnes Vikings	30	12	0	18	603	643	−40	24	
8	Wakefield Trinity	30	10	0	20	571	902	−331	20	

Source: BBC Sport
(C) Champions; (L) League Leaders' Shield Winners

=== The Qualifiers ===
Pos	Team	Pld	W	D	L	PF	PA	PD	Pts	Qualification
1	Leeds Rhinos	7	6	0	1	239	94	+145	12	2017 Super League
2	Leigh Centurions (P)	7	6	0	1	223	193	+30	12	2017 Super League
3	Huddersfield Giants	7	5	0	2	257	166	+91	10	2017 Super League
4	Hull Kingston Rovers (R)	7	4	0	3	235	142	+93	8	Million Pound Game
5	Salford Red Devils	7	3	0	4	208	152	+56	6	Million Pound Game
6	London Broncos	7	3	0	4	221	212	+9	6	2017 Championship
7	Batley Bulldogs	7	1	0	6	111	318	−207	2	2017 Championship
8	Featherstone Rovers	7	0	0	7	96	313	−217	0	2017 Championship

Source: Rugby League Project
Rules for classification: 1) Points; 2) Points difference; 3) Number of points scored;
(P) Promoted; (R) Relegated

== Play-offs ==
=== Super League ===
#	Home	Score	Away	Match Information
#	Home	Score	Away	Date and Time (Local)	Venue	Referee	Attendance
SEMI-FINALS
SF1	Warrington Wolves	18 – 10	St. Helens	29 September 20:00	Halliwell Jones Stadium	Ben Thaler	12,036
SF2	Wigan Warriors	28 – 18	Hull F.C.	30 September 20:00	DW Stadium	Robert Hicks	14,013
GRAND FINAL
F	Warrington Wolves	6 – 12	Wigan Warriors	8 October 2016 18:00	Old Trafford, Manchester	Robert Hicks	70,202

=== Million Pound Game ===
#	Home	Score	Away	Match Information
#	Home	Score	Away	Date and Time (Local)	Venue	Referee	Attendance
Million Pound Game
F	Hull Kingston Rovers	18 – 19	Salford Red Devils	1 October, 15:00 BST	Lightstream Stadium	Phil Bentham	6,562

== Player statistics ==
=== Top try scorers ===
Rank	Player	Club	Tries
1	(Samoa) Denny Solomona	Castleford Tigers	40
2	(Australia) Corey Thompson	Widnes Vikings	27
3=	(England) Jodie Broughton	Catalans Dragons	19
3=	(England) Josh Charnley	Wigan Warriors	19
5=	(England) Jermaine McGillvary	Huddersfield Giants	17
5=	(England) Ryan Atkins	Warrington Wolves	17
5=	(Ireland) Ben Currie	Warrington Wolves	17
5=	(England) Adam Swift	St. Helens	17
9	(Tonga) Fetuli Talanoa	Hull F.C.	15
10=	(England) Dominic Manfredi	Wigan Warriors	14
10=	(Tonga) Mahe Fonua	Hull F.C.	14
10=	(England) Jamie Shaul	Hull F.C.	14
10=	(Australia) Luke Dorn	Castleford Tigers	14
10=	(Scotland) Tom Johnstone	Wakefield Trinity	14
10=	(England) Tom Lineham	Warrington Wolves	14

=== Top goalscorers ===
Rank	Player	Club	Goals
1	(England) Luke Gale	Castleford Tigers	118
2	(England) Marc Sneyd	Hull F.C.	110
3	(Australia) Kurt Gidley	Warrington Wolves	87
4=	(Ireland) Liam Finn	Wakefield Trinity Wildcats	83
4=	(England) Matty Smith	Wigan Warriors	83
6	(Australia) Luke Walsh	St. Helens	71
7	(Ireland) Pat Richards	Catalans Dragons	69
8	(Scotland) Danny Brough	Huddersfield Giants	56
9	(Australia) Rhys Hanbury	Widnes Vikings	55
10	(England) Gareth O'Brien	Salford Red Devils	51

=== Top try assists ===
Rank	Player	Club	Assists
1	(England) Luke Gale	Castleford Tigers	46
2=	(Australia) Chris Sandow	Warrington Wolves	25
2=	(Australia) Luke Walsh	St. Helens	25
4=	(England) Gareth O'Brien	Salford Red Devils	22
4=	(England) Kevin Brown	Widnes Vikings	22
4=	(England) Marc Sneyd	Hull F.C.	22
7	(Australia) Luke Dorn	Castleford Tigers	21
8=	(Australia) Michael Dobson	Salford Red Devils	18
8=	(Scotland) Danny Brough	Huddersfield Giants	18
8=	(Ireland) Liam Finn	Wakefield Trinity Wildcats	18
8=	(Australia) Jacob Miller	Wakefield Trinity Wildcats	18
8=	(England) Danny Houghton	Hull F.C.	18
8=	(England) George Williams	Wigan Warriors	18

=== Top points scorers ===
Rank	Player	Club	Points
1	(England) Luke Gale	Castleford Tigers	262
2	(England) Marc Sneyd	Hull F.C.	241
3	(Australia) Kurt Gidley	Warrington Wolves	202
4	(England) Matty Smith	Wigan Warriors	195
5=	(Ireland) Pat Richards	Catalans Dragons	174
5=	(Ireland) Liam Finn	Wakefield Trinity Wildcats	174
7	(New Zealand) Denny Solomona	Castleford Tigers	160
8	(Australia) Rhys Hanbury	Widnes Vikings	158
9	(Australia) Luke Walsh	St. Helens	155
10	(Scotland) Danny Brough	Huddersfield Giants	132

- Statistics correct as of 24 September 2016

== Attendances ==
=== Average attendances ===
Club	Home Games	Total	Average	Highest	Lowest
Castleford Tigers	11	84,909	7,719	11,426	4,968
Catalans Dragons	11	107,403	9,764	11,856	8,178
Huddersfield Giants	11	59,647	5,422	7,536	4,143
Hull FC	11	125,478	11,407	17,481	9,600
Hull KR	11	85,885	7,808	11,050	6,434
Leeds Rhinos	11	174,769	15,888	17,505	14,016
Salford Red Devils	11	39,927	3,630	5,089	1,958
St Helens	11	122,275	11,116	17,980	9,299
Wakefield Trinity Wildcats	11	58,647	5,332	6,855	4,048
Warrington Wolves	11	120,230	10,930	15,008	9,024
Widnes Vikings	11	62,073	5,643	9,076	4,195
Wigan Warriors	11	149,995	13,636	20,049	10,897

=== Top 10 attendances ===
Rank	Home club	Away club	Stadium	Attendance
1	Magic Weekend: Day 1		St. James' Park	39,331
2	Magic Weekend: Day 2		St. James' Park	28,945
3	Wigan Warriors	St Helens	DW Stadium	20,049
4	St Helens	Wigan Warriors	Langtree Park	17,980
5	Leeds Rhinos	St Helens	Headingley Stadium	17,505
6	Hull FC	Hull KR	KCOM Stadium	17,481
7	Wigan Warriors	Warrington Wolves	DW Stadium	17,480
8	Leeds Rhinos	Castleford Tigers	Headingley Stadium	17,213
9	Leeds Rhinos	Wigan Warriors	Headingley Stadium	16,712
10	Leeds Rhinos	Wakefield Trinity Wildcats	Headingley Stadium	16,314

- Statistics correct as of 24 July 2016

== End-of-season awards ==
Awards are presented for outstanding contributions and efforts to players and clubs in the week leading up to the Super League Grand Final:

- Man of Steel: Danny Houghton - Hull F.C.
- Coach of the year: Lee Radford - Hull F.C.
- Super League club of the year: Hull F.C.
- Young player of the year: Tom Johnstone - Wakefield Trinity Wildcats
- Foundation of the year:
- Rhino "Top Gun": Marc Sneyd - Hull F.C.
- Metre-maker: Chris Hill - Warrington Wolves
- Top Try Scorer: Denny Solomona (40) - Castleford Tigers
- Hit Man: Danny Houghton - Hull F.C.

== Media ==
=== Television ===
2016 is the fifth and final year of a five-year contract with Sky Sports to televise 70 matches per season. The deal is worth £90million.

Sky Sports coverage in the UK will see two live matches broadcast each week, usually at 8:00 pm on Thursday and Friday nights.

Regular commentators will be Eddie Hemmings and Mike Stephenson with summarisers including Phil Clarke, Brian Carney, Barrie McDermott and Terry O'Connor. Sky will broadcast highlights on Sunday nights on Super League - Full Time at 10 p.m.

BBC Sport will broadcast a highlights programme called the Super League Show, presented by Tanya Arnold. The BBC show two weekly broadcasts of the programme, the first to the BBC North West, Yorkshire, North East and Cumbria, and East Yorkshire and Lincolnshire regions on Monday evenings at 11:35 p.m. on BBC One, while a repeat showing is shown nationally on BBC Two on Tuesday afternoons at 1.30 p.m. The Super League Show is also available for one week after broadcast for streaming or download via the BBC iPlayer in the UK only. End of season play-offs are shown on BBC Two across the whole country in a weekly highlights package on Sunday afternoons.

Internationally, Super League is shown live or delayed on beIN Sports (France), Showtime Sports (Middle East), Sky Sport (New Zealand), TV 2 Sport (Norway), Fox Soccer Plus (United States), Fox Sports (Australia) and Sportsnet World (Canada).

=== Radio ===
BBC Coverage:

- BBC Radio 5 Live Sports Extra (National DAB Digital Radio) will carry two Super League commentaries each week on Thursday and Friday nights (both kick off 8pm); this will be through the 5 Live Rugby league programme which is presented by Dave Woods with a guest summariser (usually a Super League player or coach) and also includes interviews and debate..
- BBC Radio Humberside will have full match commentary of all Hull KR and Hull matches.
- BBC Radio Leeds carry commentaries featuring Leeds, Castleford, Wakefield and Huddersfield.
- BBC Radio Manchester will carry commentary of Wigan and Salford whilst sharing commentary of Warrington with BBC Radio Merseyside.
- BBC Radio Merseyside (will have commentary on St Helens and Widnes matches whilst sharing commentary of Warrington with BBC Radio Manchester.

Commercial Radio Coverage:

- 102.4 Wish FM will carry commentaries of Wigan & St Helens matches.
- 107.2 Wire FM will carry commentaries on Warrington Home and Away.
- Radio Yorkshire will launch in March carrying Super League commentaries.
- Radio Warrington (Online Station) all Warrington home games and some away games.
- Grand Sud FM covers every Catalans Dragons Home Match (in French).
- Radio France Bleu Roussillon covers every Catalans Dragons Away Match (in French).
- Talksport and Talksport 2 will carry weekly live matches throughout the UK, plus phone-in programs and a weekly magazine show hosted by Robbie Hunter-Paul.

All Super League commentaries on any station are available via the particular stations on-line streaming.
