= Nick Gregson =

English rugby league footballer

Personal information
- Full name: Nicholas Gregson
- Born: 17 December 1995 (age 29)
- Height: 6 ft 0 in (183 cm)
- Weight: 14 st 11 lb (94 kg)

Playing information

Rugby league
Club
Years	Team	Pld	T	G	FG	P
2016–17	Wigan Warriors	16	2	0	0	8
2016(loan)	→ Swinton Lions	1	1	0	0	4
2017(loan)	→ Swinton Lions	2	0	0	0	0
2018–19	Leigh Centurions	21	3	3	0	18
2018(loan)	→ Workington Town	3	1	0	0	4
2018(loan)	→ Oldham	1	0	0	0	0
2019(loan)	→ Oldham	2	0	0	0	0
2019–23	Swinton Lions	62	12	7	0	62
2024–	Widnes Vikings	11	2	0	0	8
	Total	119	21	10	0	104

Rugby union
Club
Years	Team	Pld	T	G	FG	P
2019	Preston Grasshoppers R.F.C.			0	0
- Source: As of 5 November 2023

Nick Gregson (born 17 December 1995) is a professional rugby league footballer who plays as a Second-row for the Widnes Vikings in the Championship.

== Playing career ==
=== Leigh Centurions ===
In October 2017 he left the Wigan Warriors to play for the Leigh Centurions in the Championship from the 2018 season. He also spent two loan spells at Oldham RLFC.

=== Widnes Vikings ===
On 5 November 2023 it was reported that he had signed for Widnes in the RFL Championship.
