= Josh Charnley =

English dual code rugby footballer

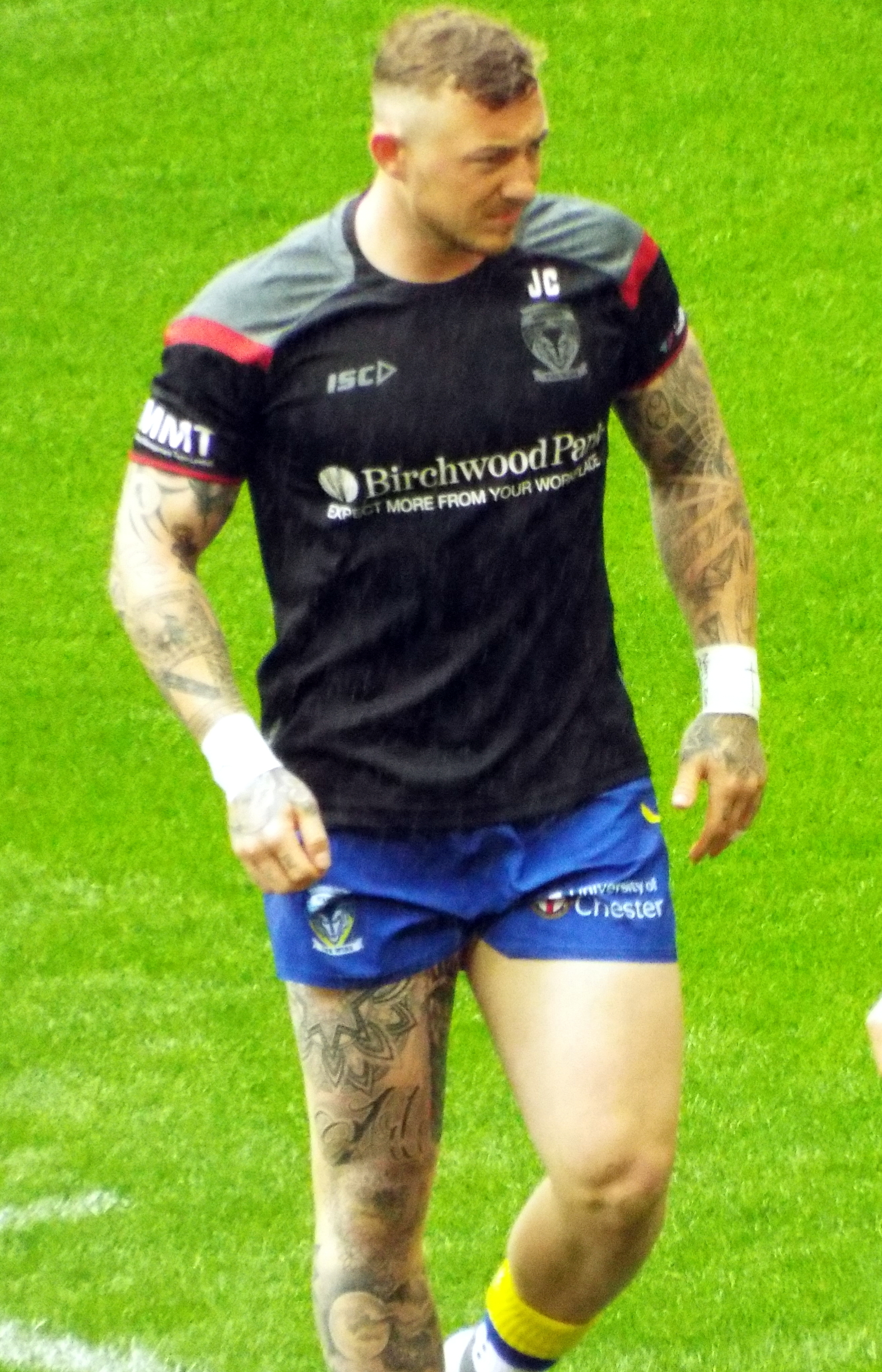

Personal information
- Full name: Joshua Charnley
- Born: 26 June 1991 (age 35) Chorley, Lancashire, England
- Height: 6 ft 1 in (1.85 m)
- Weight: 16 st 3 lb (103 kg)

Playing information

Rugby league
- Position: Wing, Centre
Club
Years	Team	Pld	T	G	FG	P
2010–16	Wigan Warriors	173	164	103	0	862
2010(loan)	→ Blackpool Panthers	3	5	10	0	40
2010(loan)	→ Hull Kingston Rovers	5	5	0	0	20
2018–22	Warrington Wolves	108	69	0	0	276
2022–	Leigh Leopards	101	75	0	0	300
	Total	390	318	113	0	1498
Representative
Years	Team	Pld	T	G	FG	P
2011	England Knights	1	2	4	0	16
2012–14	England	8	10	0	0	40

Rugby union
- Position: Centre, Wing
Club
Years	Team	Pld	T	G	FG	P
2016–18	Sale Sharks	32	4	0	0	20
- Source: As of 16 October 2026

Joshua Charnley (born 26 June 1991) is an English professional rugby league footballer who plays as a winger for the Leigh Leopards in the Betfred Super League.

He previously played for the Warrington Wolves and the Wigan Warriors, with whom he won the 2013 and 2016 Super League Grand Finals, and was on loan from Wigan at Hull Kingston Rovers in the Super League. At international level, he played for the England Knights in 2011 and won 8 caps for England between 2012 and 2014.

Charnley also played rugby union for the Sale Sharks in the Aviva Premiership from 2016 to 2018.

== Club career ==
=== Academy ===
Charnley made numerous appearances for the Under 20s in 2010 before joining Blackpool Panthers on dual registration and then Hull Kingston Rovers on loan. He was a player around the fringes of a first team opportunity at Wigan before the possibility came to join Hull Kingston Rovers for a month. Injuries meant he was given the chance to play first team rugby by Hull KR coach Justin Morgan, making his Super League debut. Charnley showed great promise on his debut for Hull KR against Leeds Rhinos and picked up the club man of the match award. He scored five tries in five appearances, including a hat-trick in a home win over Castleford Tigers, and the opening try in the derby clash with Hull FC.

=== Wigan Warriors ===
Charnley made his first team debut for Wigan at Craven Park against Hull Kingston Rovers in August where he scored a try off the bench.

He played on the wing in the 2011 Challenge Cup Final victory over the Leeds side at Wembley Stadium. Charnley scored the first try, and broke a bone in his hand in his side's victory over Leeds.

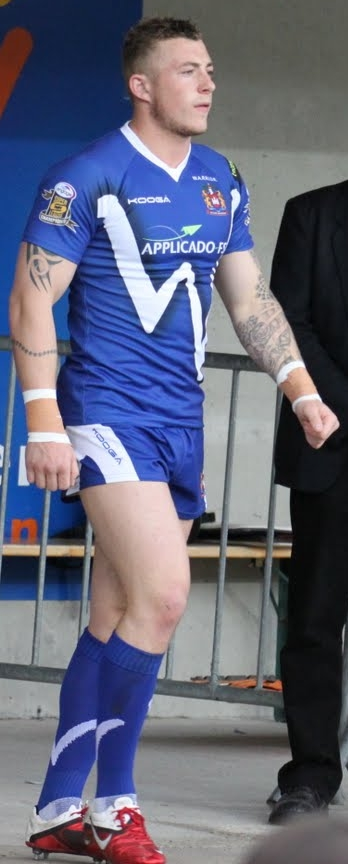
Charnley playing for Wigan

In the 2012 Super League season he scored 31 tries to help Wigan to the League Leaders' Shield. This put Charnley in third place in the all-time top try scorers in a regular season in the summer era as only Lesley Vainikolo (36 tries) and Danny McGuire (35 tries), both in 2004, have scored more tries in a Super League regular season.

Charnley then went onto an even better 2013 season helping Wigan to the double (Challenge Cup winners and Super League champions) scoring a record-breaking 43 tries ranking him first. He played in the 2013 Challenge Cup Final victory over Hull F.C. at Wembley Stadium. He played in the 2013 Super League Grand Final victory over the Warrington Wolves at Old Trafford.

Although the game ended in a 36–14 defeat for Wigan, Charnley scored two tries in the 2014 World Club Challenge against NRL champions the Sydney Roosters. On 18 June 2014, he scored five tries in a 48–4 victory over Widnes Vikings. Despite missing two months of action due to a knee injury, Charnley still scored at a rate of over a try a game with 23 tries in 21 games in the 2014 season.

He played in the 2014 Super League Grand Final defeat by St Helens at Old Trafford. During the 2016 season, it was announced that Charnley would switch codes to join Sale Sharks at the end of the 2016 Super League season. Charnley signed off in style as he scored the winning try in the 2016 Super League Grand Final against Warrington, chasing and touching down a beautifully weighted kick from Dan Sarginson at Old Trafford.

=== Sale Sharks ===
On 30 March 2016, Charnley made the cross-code switch to rugby union with Manchester-based Sale Sharks, who compete in the Aviva Premiership, for the 2016–17 season. Charnley was not able to repeat his scoring success in rugby union, bagging four tries in 32 games. Charnley then returned to rugby league for the 2018 summer season, his last game in rugby union coming against London Irish in February.

=== Warrington Wolves ===
Charnley returned to rugby league for the 2018 season with Super League club, Warrington Wolves. He played in the 2018 Challenge Cup Final defeat by the Catalans Dragons at Wembley Stadium and the Super League Grand Final defeat by the Wigan Warriors at Old Trafford.

In his second season with the Wolves, Charnley played in the 2019 Challenge Cup Final victory over St. Helens at Wembley Stadium.

=== Leigh Leopards ===
On 25 June 2022, Charnley signed an initial loan deal with Championship side Leigh with a permanent contract starting in 2023. On 10 July 2022, Charnley made his debut for Leigh, scoring a try during a 66–0 victory over Workington Town. On 28 August 2022, Charnley scored two tries for Leigh in a 42–4 victory over Widnes. In round 3 of the 2023 Super League season, Charnley scored two tries including the winner as Leigh earned their first win back in the top flight defeating Hull Kingston Rovers 30-25. In round 6, Charnley scored a hat-trick as Leigh defeated Hull F.C. 24-16. On 12 August 2023, Charnley played for Leigh in their 17-16 Challenge Cup final victory over Hull Kingston Rovers. Charnley played 26 games for Leigh in the 2023 Super League season and scored 27 tries as the club finished fifth on the table and qualified for the playoffs. He played in their elimination playoff loss against Hull Kington Rovers. In May 2024, he scored his 300th career try in a win against Salford Red Devils. Charnley played 25 games for Leigh in the 2024 Super League season which saw the club finish fifth on the table. He played in the clubs semi-final loss to Wigan.

== International career ==
Charnley made his representative debut for the England Knights in a friendly against France in 2011, scoring two tries and kicking four goals from six kicks. He went on to make another scoring appearance against Cumbria one week later.

Charnley made his senior international debut for England against Wales in the 2012 Autumn International Series, scoring four tries in his first appearance for England. He represented England in the 2013 Rugby League World Cup, scoring a try against Australia in the tournament's opening fixture, and a brace against France in the quarter-final. During the 2014 Four Nations, he scored a try in the loss to New Zealand.

== Honours ==
Grand Final: 3

2010, 2013, 2016

League Leaders' Shield: 2

2010, 2012

Challenge Cup: 4

2011, 2013, 2019, 2023

Super League Top Try Scorer: 2

2012 (31 tries), 2013 (33 tries)

He is joint 21st with Garry Schofield on the all time record of 330 tries in the British game (318 at club level, 2 for England Knights & 10 for England) (as of 17 May 2026)
