= Ben Flower =

Wales international rugby league footballer

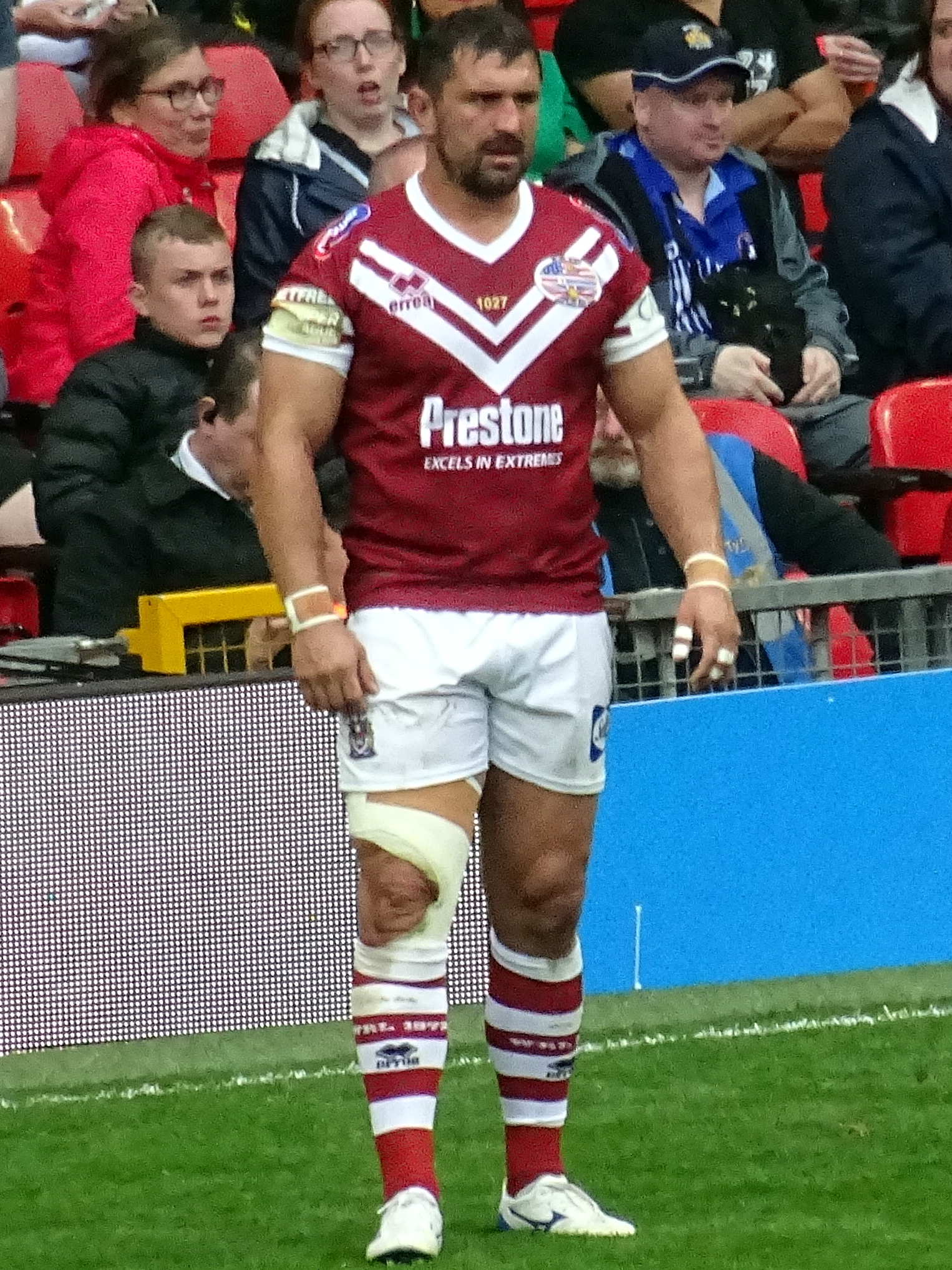

Personal information
- Full name: Benjamin Thomas Flower
- Born: 19 October 1987 (age 39) Cardiff, Wales
- Height: 6 ft 0 in (1.83 m)
- Weight: 17 st 2 lb (109 kg)

Playing information

Rugby union
Club
Years	Team	Pld	T	G	FG	P
	Newport Gwent Dragons	0	0	0	0	0
2008	Bedwas RFC	0	0	0	0	0
2021	Pontypool RFC	0	0	0	0	0
	Total	0	0	0	0	0

Rugby league
- Position: Prop, Loose forward
Club
Years	Team	Pld	T	G	FG	P
2008–11	Crusaders RL	66	7	0	0	28
2010(loan)	→ S Wales Scorpions	4	1	0	0	4
2012–20	Wigan Warriors	184	21	0	0	84
2021	Leigh Centurions	5	0	0	0	0
	Total	259	29	0	0	116
Representative
Years	Team	Pld	T	G	FG	P
2008–13	Wales	17	1	0	0	4
- Source: As of 28 Sep 2021

Ben Flower (born 19 October 1987) is a Welsh professional former rugby league footballer who last played as a prop for the Leigh Centurions in the Super League, and has played for Wales at international level.

He previously played as a second-row and loose forward for Crusaders Rugby League in the Super League, and spent time away from Crusaders RL on loan at the South Wales Scorpions in Championship 1. Flower also spent 9 seasons at the Wigan Warriors in the top flight.

He punched Lance Hohaia in the face twice in the second minute of the Super League Grand Final in 2014, including once while Hohaia was lying on the ground, which led to a six-month ban.

== Background ==
Flower was born in Cardiff, Wales.

== Playing career ==
=== Early career and Crusaders ===
An under-17 international when at Cardiff Demons, Flower also played for Wales in rugby union at under 18, under 19 and under 20 level. He was signed by the Crusaders from Welsh Premiership rugby union side Bedwas RFC, having also played for regional side Newport Gwent Dragons.

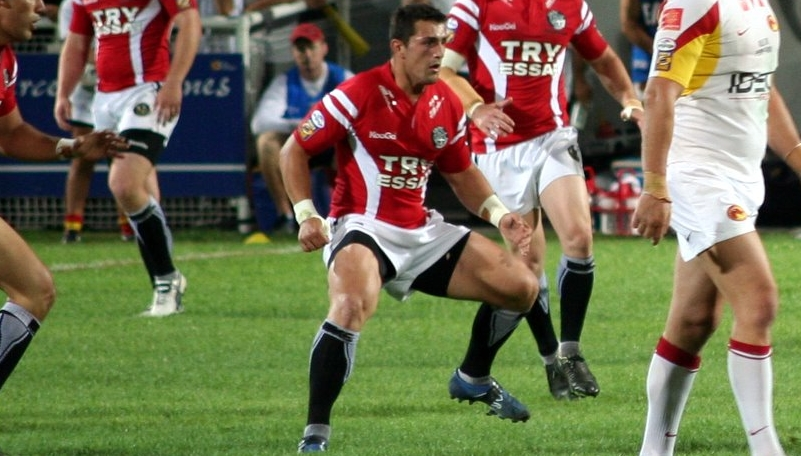
Flower playing for Crusaders RL in 2009

Flower progressed as a professional rugby league footballer throughout 2007, starting in Crusaders Colts before becoming a regular in the Crusaders first team and winning his first full Welsh cap in 2008. He played for Crusaders in their first Super League season in 2009, and remained with the club until their departure from the league in 2011, after which he signed for Wigan Warriors.

In 2010, Flower was loaned from Crusaders to South Wales Scorpions of Championship 1, and made four appearances for the club, scoring one try.

=== Wigan Warriors ===
==== 2012 ====
Flower made 18 appearances in his first season with Wigan.

==== 2013 ====
In 2013, he established himself as a first-choice player and was a member of the team that won the 2013 Challenge Cup Final with victory over Hull F.C. at Wembley Stadium.

He played in the 2013 Super League Grand Final victory over the Warrington Wolves at Old Trafford.

==== Lance Hohaia incident ====
On 11 October 2014 Flower became the first player to be sent off in a Super League Grand Final after being shown a red card in the second minute of the match for twice punching Lance Hohaia of St Helens in the face, including once while Hohaia was lying on the ground. Wigan went on to lose the match after playing with a man down for 78 minutes. Flower was subsequently given a six-month ban by the RFL disciplinary committee, the longest in the competition's history for an on-field act. Hohaia retired from rugby league on 29 April 2015, citing recurrent concussion symptoms as the reason.

==== 2015 ====
Flower made his comeback against Warrington Wolves on 16 April. He was wished well ahead of his return by Lance Hohaia. He went on to make 19 appearances scoring four tries.

He played in the 2015 Super League Grand Final defeat by the Leeds Rhinos at Old Trafford.

==== 2016 ====
In early February he signed a new four-year deal running till the end of 2020 despite interest from other Super League and NRL clubs. His 27 appearances across the season saw him score three tries.

He played in the 2016 Super League Grand Final victory over the Warrington Wolves at Old Trafford.

==== 2017 ====
Flower helped Wigan win a fourth World Club Challenge in the 22-6 victory over Cronulla-Sutherland Sharks. He made a good start to the season before after 13 appearances he suffered an Achilles tendon injury ending his season.

==== 2018 ====
He played in the 2018 Super League Grand Final victory over the Warrington Wolves at Old Trafford.

==== 2019 ====
Flower played 18 games for Wigan in 2019 including their shock semi-final loss against Salford.

==== 2020 ====
Flower played only nine games for Wigan in the 2020 season. In the semi-final victory over Hull F.C., Flower was taken from the field in the second half with a leg injury. He was later ruled out of the 2020 Super League Grand Final. It was announced on 30 November 2020 that Flower would join Leigh Centurions for the 2021 season

==== 2021 ====
Flower retired from rugby league and signed for Welsh rugby union club Pontypool RFC in the Welsh Championship 2021.

== International career ==
Flower made his Wales début against England while at Celtic Crusaders in 2008.

He represented Wales in the 2010 European Cup, and the 2011 Rugby League Four Nations, and was named in the squad for the 2013 Rugby League World Cup.
