= Luke Waterworth =

English rugby league footballer

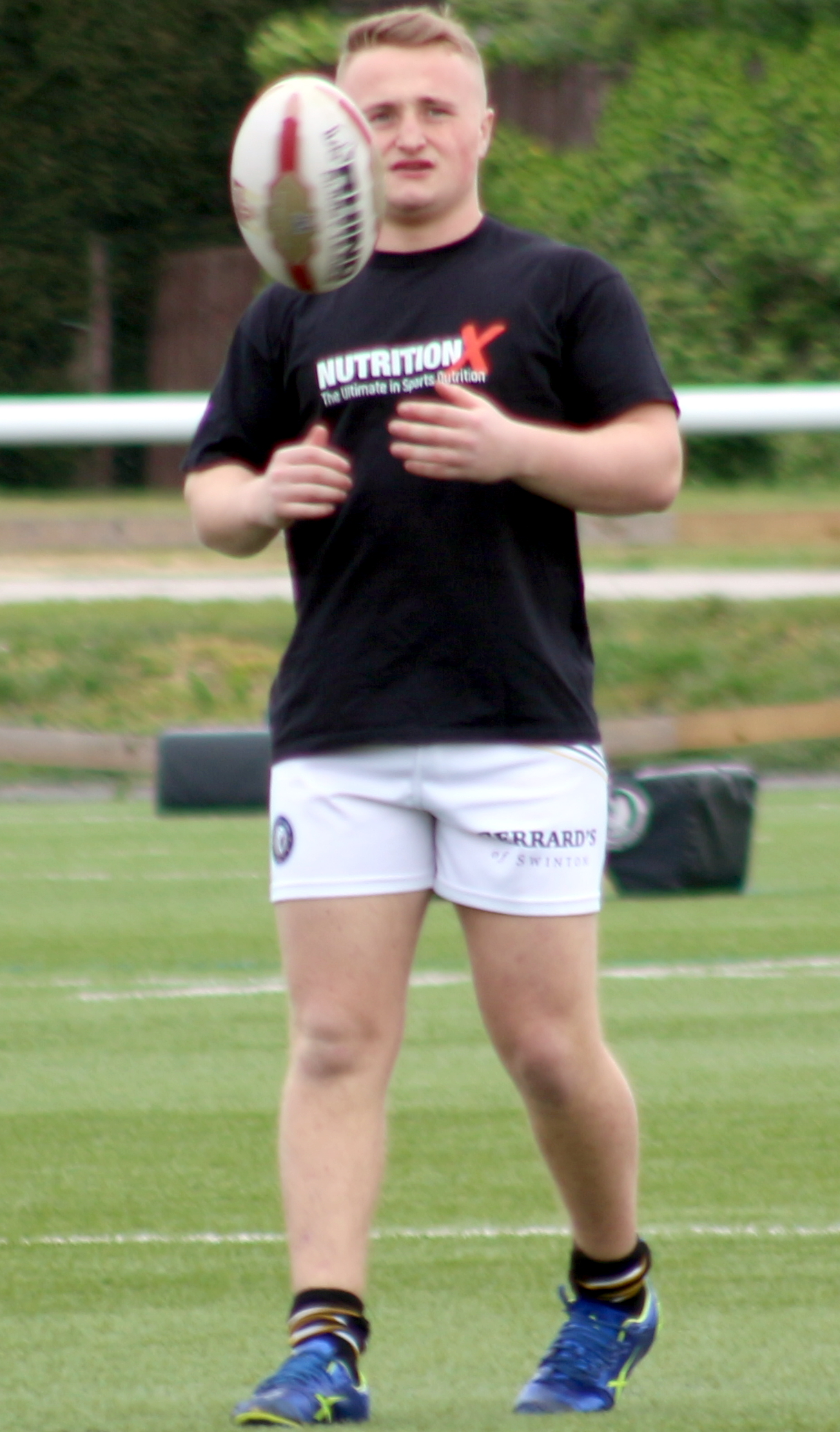

Personal information
- Born: 20 June 1996 (age 29) Greater Manchester, England
- Height: 5 ft 9 in (175 cm)
- Weight: 13 st 10 lb (87 kg)

Playing information
- Position: Hooker
Club
Years	Team	Pld	T	G	FG	P
2016	Wigan Warriors	1	0	0	0	0
2016(loan)	→ Swinton Lions	12	1	0	0	4
2017–23	Swinton Lions	49	10	0	0	38
2026–	Rochdale Hornets	0	0	0	0	0
	Total	62	11	0	0	42
- Source: As of 9 October 2025

Luke Waterworth (born 20 June 1996) is a professional rugby league footballer who plays as a hooker for Rochdale Hornets in the RFL League 1.

== Playing career ==
He started his amateur career with Ince Rose Bridge.

=== Wigan Warriors ===
He was previously contracted to the Wigan Warriors in the Super League.

=== Swinton Lions ===
He has spent time on loan at Swinton Lions in the Championship.

=== Rochdale Hornets ===
On 8 October 2025 it was reported that he had returned to rugby league joining Rochdale Hornets.
