= Jack Higginson (rugby league) =

Ireland international rugby league footballer

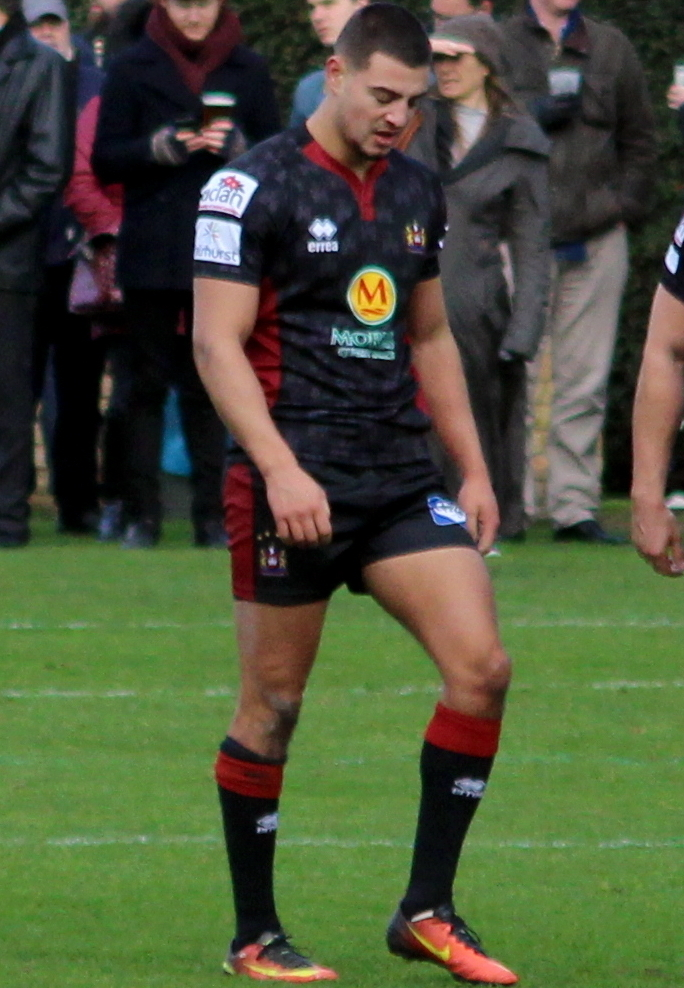

Personal information
- Full name: Jack Higginson
- Born: 4 April 1997 (age 28); Rochdale, England
- Height: 6 ft 0 in (184 cm)
- Weight: 13 st 5 lb (85 kg)

Playing information
- Position: Centre, Wing
Club
Years	Team	Pld	T	G	FG	P
2016–18	Wigan Warriors	3	1	0	0	4
2017(loan)	→ Swinton Lions	1	0	0	0	0
2017(loan)	→ Workington Town	2	1	0	0	4
2018(loan)	→ Swinton Lions	1	0	0	0	0
2019	Leigh Centurions	4	2	0	0	8
2019(loan)	→Rochdale Hornets	3	1	0	0	4
2020–21	Rochdale Hornets	0	0	0	0	0
	Total	14	5	0	0	20
Representative
Years	Team	Pld	T	G	FG	P
2018–	Ireland	3	2	0	0	8
- Source: As of 2 February 2020

Jack Higginson (born 4 April 1997) is an Ireland international rugby league footballer who plays as a centre or winger for the Rochdale Hornets in League 1.

== Career ==
=== Rochdale Hornets ===
On 29 January 2020 it was announced that Higginson has signed for Rochdale Hornets

=== International ===
He was named in the Ireland squad for the 2017 Rugby League World Cup.
