= George Williams (rugby league, born 1994) =

Great Britain and England international rugby league footballer

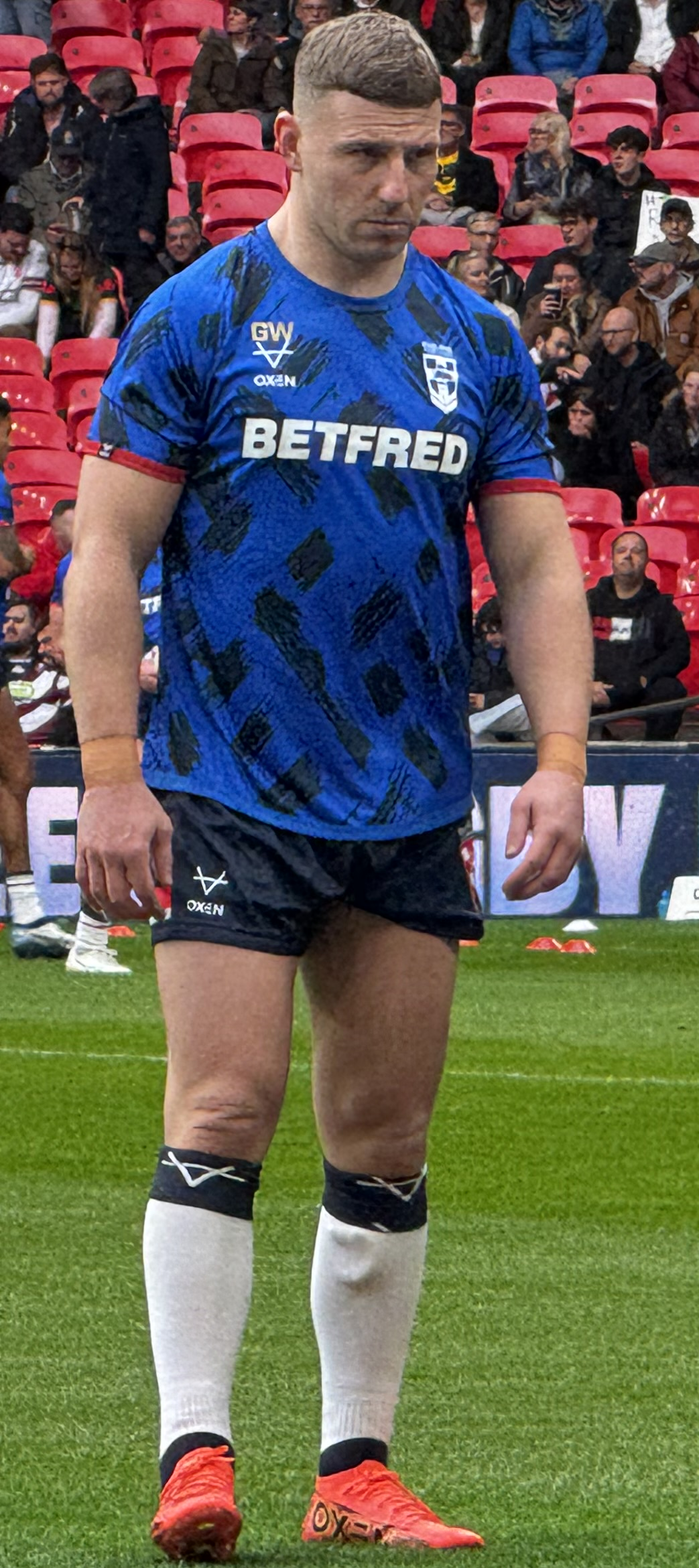

Personal information
- Born: 31 October 1994 (age 32) Wigan, Lancashire, England
- Height: 5 ft 11 in (1.80 m)
- Weight: 14 st 5 lb (91 kg)

Playing information
- Position: Scrum-half, Stand-off
Club
| Years | Team | Pld | T | G | FG | P |
|---|---|---|---|---|---|---|
| 2013–19 | Wigan Warriors | 179 | 61 | 70 | 1 | 385 |
| 2013(loan) | → South Wales Scorpions | 1 | 0 | 0 | 0 | 0 |
| 2020–21 | Canberra Raiders | 32 | 10 | 16 | 2 | 74 |
| 2021–26 | Warrington Wolves | 118 | 42 | 2 | 6 | 178 |
| 2027– | Dolphins | 0 | 0 | 0 | 0 | 0 |
| | Total | 330 | 113 | 88 | 9 | 637 |
Representative
| Years | Team | Pld | T | G | FG | P |
| 2015– | England | 26 | 12 | 1 | 0 | 50 |
| 2019 | Great Britain | 1 | 0 | 0 | 0 | 0 |
- Source: As of 16 November 2026

George Williams (born 31 October 1994) is an English professional rugby league footballer who plays as a scrum-half and stand-off for the Dolphins in the National Rugby League (NRL) in Australia, and England at international level.

He has previously played as a stand-off for the Wigan Warriors in the Super League, and spent time on loan from Wigan at the South Wales Scorpions in Championship 1. Williams spent two years in the NRL playing for the Canberra Raiders, however he was released during the 2021 NRL season on compassionate grounds.

== Background ==
Williams was born in Wigan, Greater Manchester, England.

== Club career ==
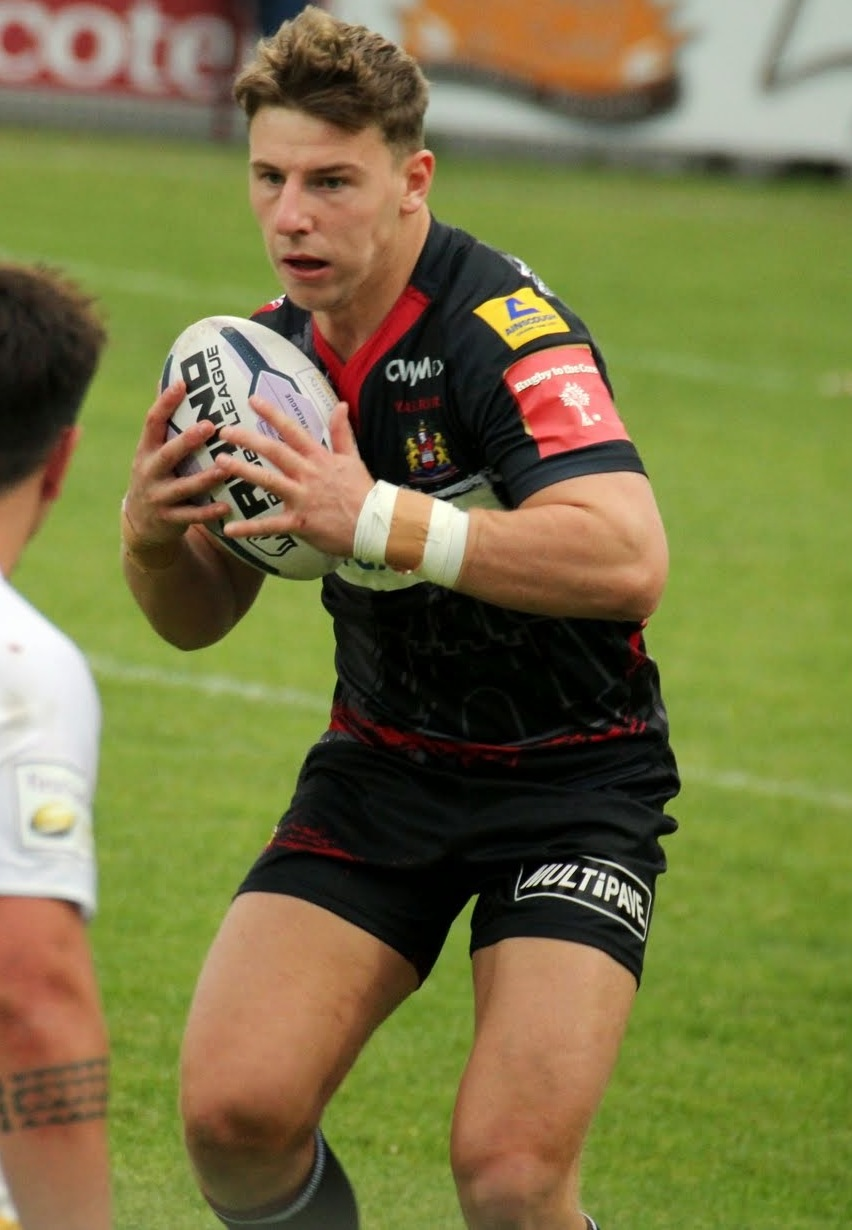
Williams playing for Wigan in 2015

=== Wigan Warriors ===
Williams was born on 31 October 1994 in Wigan, Greater Manchester, and began playing junior rugby league at local amateur teams Ince Rose Bridge and Wigan St Patricks. He joined the Wigan scholarship programme and was signed to their Academy team in 2011 on a four-year contract.

Williams made his senior début in the fourth round of the Challenge Cup in April 2013, scoring a try in a 60–10 victory over Championship club Leigh. He made his first Super League appearance a month later against London Broncos, scoring another try, and also played against Widnes. He returned to the academy side later in the season, helping Wigan win the under-19 Grand Final with two tries in a 34–10 victory against Leeds.

Williams became a regular in the first team during the 2014 season, and signed a new four-year contract in May 2014. He made 23 appearances during the season, scoring seven tries, including his first senior hat-trick against Hull F.C. in July 2014. He appeared for Wigan as a substitute in the 2014 Super League Grand Final defeat by St. Helens.

Following the departure of Blake Green, Williams became the first-choice stand-off for Wigan and was assigned the number 6 jersey before the start of the 2015 season. He played in the World Club Series against Brisbane. Williams made 33 appearances and was a near ever-present throughout the season, missing only one game early in the year against Huddersfield after suffering an injury during the warm-up.

Williams was awarded the Super League Young Player of the Year award at the Man of Steel awards on 5 October 2015. Williams also played in the 2015 Grand Final, but was again on the losing side as Wigan were defeated 20–22 against Leeds at Old Trafford.

In 2016, Williams again featured in the World Club Series against Brisbane, scoring one try in a heavy 12–42 defeat. Williams also won his first club honours, with Wigan defeating the Warrington club in the 2016 Grand Final at Old Trafford.

On 19 February 2017, Williams was the stand-out performer in the 2017 World Club Challenge against National Rugby League Premiers Cronulla-Sutherland Sharks, helping Wigan to a 22–6 win. In April 2017, he signed a new four-year contract with Wigan.

On 26 August 2017, Williams played in his first Challenge Cup final, with Wigan losing 14–18 to Hull F.C. at Wembley Stadium.

He played in the 2018 Super League Grand Final victory over Warrington at Old Trafford.

=== Canberra Raiders ===
On 9 July 2019, it was announced that Williams would leave Wigan to join the Canberra Raiders for the 2020 National Rugby League season.

Williams played 22 games for Canberra in the 2020 NRL season as the club fell one game short of the grand final.

On 25 May 2021, Williams was released from his contract with Canberra citing homesickness as the key reason. It was initially reported that Williams had demanded an immediate release from the club until the player took to Twitter explaining his side of the story. Williams said "I asked for a release weeks ago for the end of the season... Not once did I ask for a immediate release but instead of supporting me the club kicked me out the door".

On 22 June 2021, Williams fired one final parting shot at Canberra head coach Ricky Stuart saying “I'm just sad that relationship is pretty sour, I’ve not spoken to him since the release. He was brilliant and I’ll never forget that, but when things went bad he turned his back on me".

=== Warrington Wolves ===
On 8 July 2021, it was reported that he had signed for Warrington in the Super League. He made his Warrington debut against Leeds on 1 August 2021, scoring a last minute drop-goal in a 27–26 victory. He was awarded Heritage Number 1174 for Warrington. In round 24 of the 2021 Super League season, he kicked two drop goals including the winner in golden point extra-time as Warrington beat Salford 20–19. In round 24 of the 2023 Super League season, Williams scored two tries for Warrington in their 66–12 victory over Castleford. Williams played 23 games for Warrington in the 2023 Super League season and scored 11 tries as Warrington finished sixth on the table and qualified for the playoffs. Williams played in the clubs elimination playoff loss against St Helens. On 8 June 2024, Williams played in Warrington's 2024 Challenge Cup final defeat against Wigan. In the 2024 elimination playoff against St Helens, Williams kicked the winning drop goal in Warrington's 23-22 golden point extra-time victory. Williams played a total of 26 games for Warrington in the 2024 Super League season including their semi-final loss against Hull Kingston Rovers. On 16 April 2025, it was announced that Williams would miss at least eight weeks with an ankle injury. On 7 June 2025, Williams played in Warrington's 8-6 Challenge Cup final loss against Hull Kingston Rovers. He is currently rumoured to be re-joining the NRL with a move to the Dolphins. On 25 September 2025 it was reported that Williams had signed with the Dolphins from the 2027 season. On 3 October 2026, Williams played in the 2026 Super League Grand Final, which Warrington lost to Wakefield Trinity 23-10.

=== Dolphins (NRL) ===
On 13 October 2026, the Dolphins officially announced Williams had signed with the club on a two year deal.

== International career ==
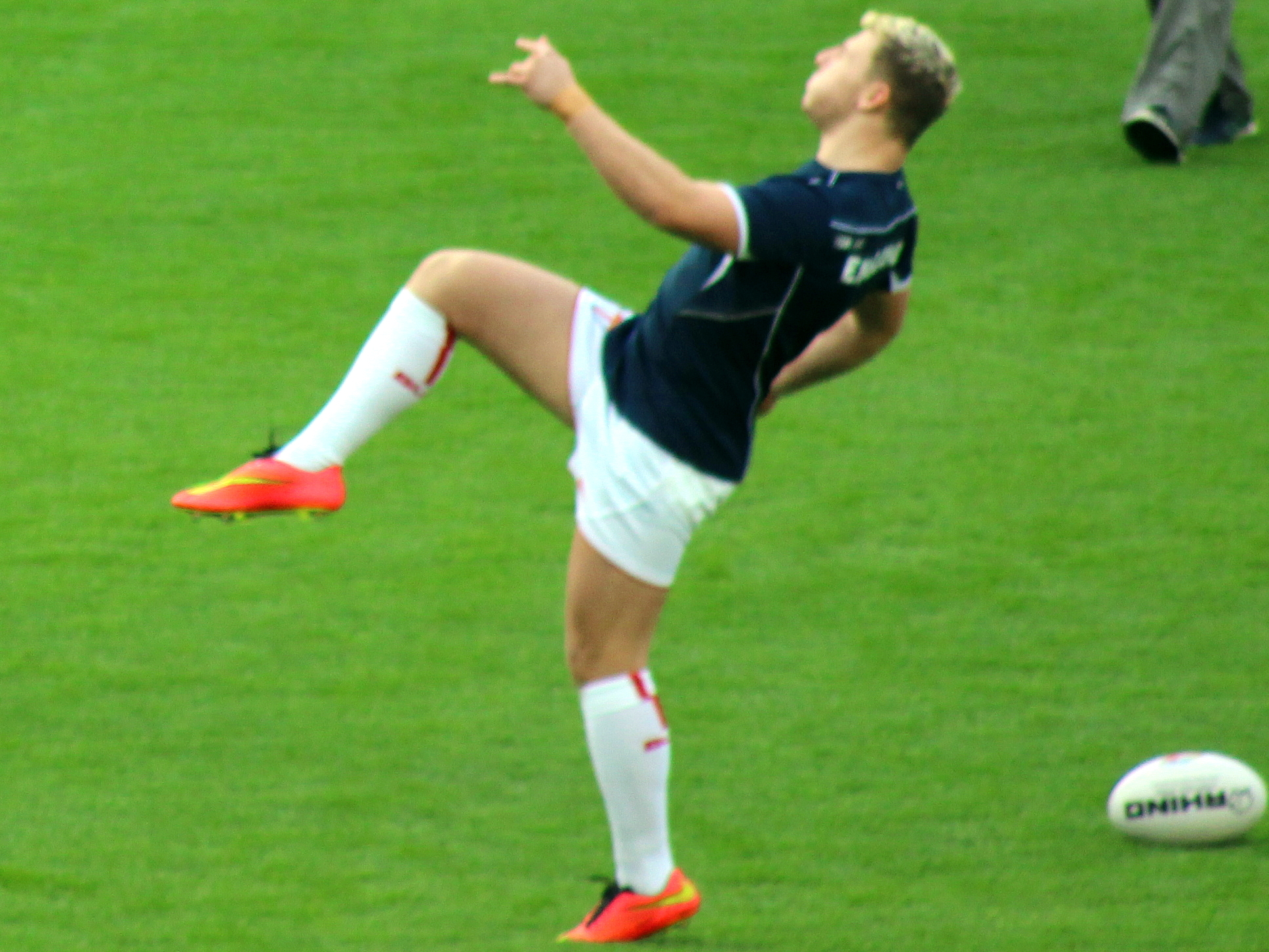
Williams warming up for England in 2016

Williams made his international début for England in 2015, and represented England at the 2017 World Cup.

After an outstanding Super League 2015 season, Williams was selected in the England team for their test series against New Zealand. Williams made his début for England in a test match, before the series, against France which saw Williams score a try in England's rout of their opponents.

In October 2016, Williams was selected in the England squad for the 2016 Four Nations.

In October 2017 he was selected in the England squad for the 2017 Rugby League World Cup, making two appearances for England in the group stages.

He was selected in England's 9s squad for the 2019 Rugby League World Cup 9s.

He was selected in the squad for the 2019 Great Britain Lions tour of the Southern Hemisphere.

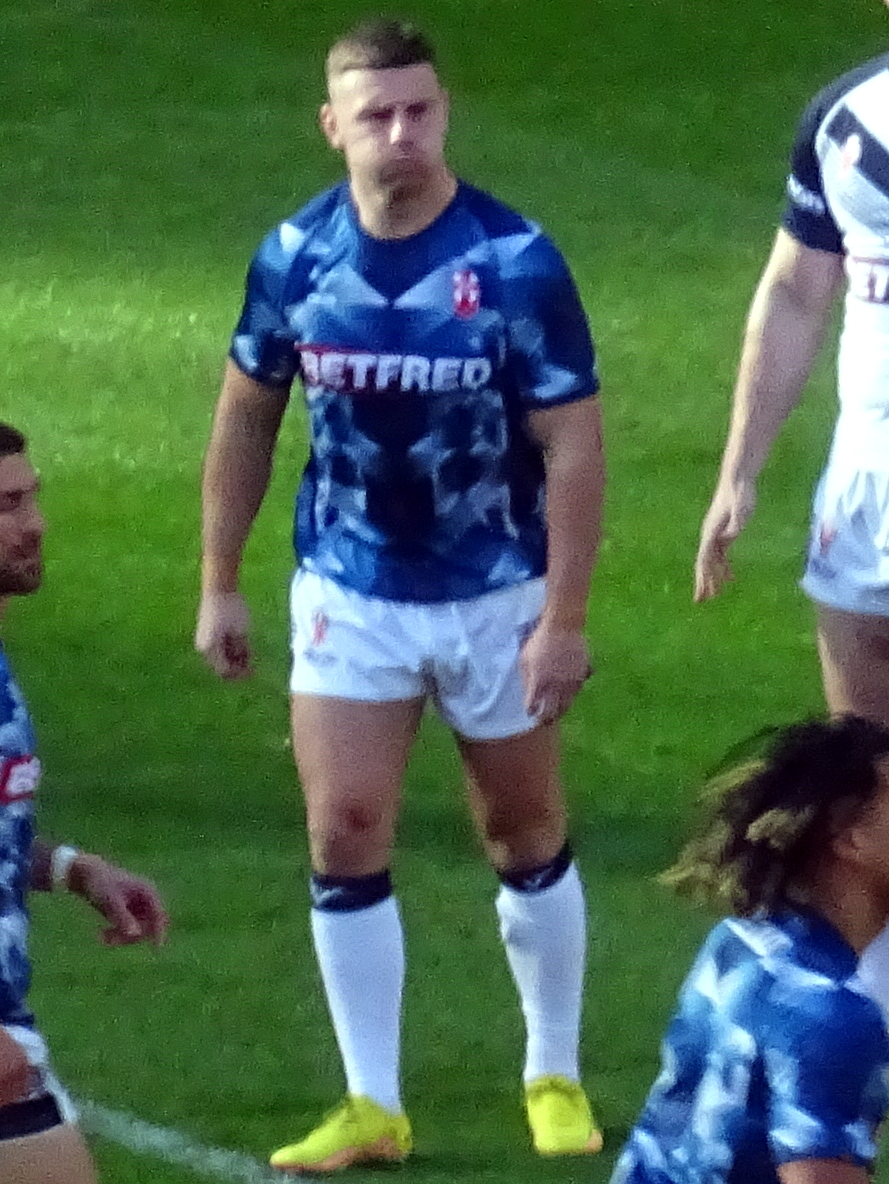
Williams warming up for England in 2022

In October he was named in the England squad for the 2021 Rugby League World Cup.

In November he was named in the 2021 Rugby League World Cup Team of the Tournament.

In April 2023 Williams was named as England captain for the match against France at Warrington. Williams scored a hat-trick in the match as England won the game 64–0.

== Career statistics ==
| Season | Team | Apps | Tries | Goals | DG | Points |
|---|---|---|---|---|---|---|
| 2013 | Wigan Warriors | 3 | 2 | 0 | 0 | 8 |
| 2014 | Wigan Warriors | 23 | 7 | 11 | 0 | 50 |
| 2015 | Wigan Warriors | 33 | 8 | 0 | 0 | 32 |
| 2016 | Wigan Warriors | 26 | 12 | 0 | 0 | 48 |
| 2017 | Wigan Warriors | 33 | 11 | 54 | 1 | 153 |
| 2018 | Wigan Warriors | 27 | 6 | 5 | 0 | 34 |
| 2019 | Wigan Warriors | 34 | 15 | 0 | 0 | 60 |
| 2020 | Canberra Raiders | 22 | 7 | | 1 | 29 |
| 2021 | Canberra Raiders | 10 | 3 | 16 | 1 | 45 |
| 2021 | Warrington Wolves | 8 | 3 | | 3 | 15 |
| 2022 | Warrington Wolves | 23 | 8 | | | 32 |
| 2023 | Warrington Wolves | 25 | 11 | | 1 | 45 |
| 2024 | Warrington Wolves | 26 | 10 | | 2 | 43 |
| 2025 | Warrington Wolves | 9 | 3 | | | 12 |
| 2026 | Warrington Wolves | | | | | |
| 2027 | Dolphins | | | | | |
| Total | | 301 | 105 | 86 | 8 | 602 |

== Honours ==
=== Club ===
- Super League
  - Winners (2): 2016, 2018
- Challenge Cup
  - Winners (1): 2013
- World Club Challenge
  - Winners (1): 2017

=== Individual ===
- Super League Young Player of the Year: 2015
- Rugby League World Cup Team of the Tournament: 2021
