= 2017 World Club Series =

2017 Dacia World Club Series
- League: World Club Series
- Duration: 2 games
- Teams: 4
- Highest attendance: 21,011 Wigan Warriors vs Cronulla-Sutherland Sharks
- Lowest attendance: 12,082 Warrington Wolves vs Brisbane Broncos
- Broadcast partners: (United Kingdom) Sky Sports (United Kingdom) BBC Sport (United Kingdom) SLTV (Australia) Nine Network (France) beIN Sport (United States) Fox Soccer Plus (Europe) Sport Klub

2017 Series
- World Champions: Wigan Warriors
- Series Winners: (England) Super League
- Runners-up: Cronulla-Sutherland Sharks
- Top point-scorer: Joe Burgess (12)
- Top try-scorer: Joe Burgess (3)

The 2017 World Club Series (also known as the 2017 Dacia World Club Series) was the third staging of the World Club Series and featured two Super League teams and two National Rugby League (NRL) teams. The series included the World Club Challenge, a one-off match between the champions of the Super League and NRL.

== Background ==
In 2016, it was suggested that future World Club Series could be expanded to eight teams, but several NRL clubs were resistant to this plan. In October 2016, NRL Grand Final runners up Melbourne Storm announced they would not be participating due to it interfering with their pre-season.

The Brisbane Broncos were the only side that finished in the top 8 from that season that accepted an invitation to play meaning the series would be reduced to only two teams. Challenge Cup winners Hull F.C. would consequently not be able to participate as no game could be arranged.

== Series details ==
=== Series Score ===
Winners	Score	Runners-up
(England) Super League	2–0	(Australia) NRL

=== Game 1: Warrington Vs Brisbane ===
18 February

Warrington Wolves	27 – 18	Brisbane Broncos
Tries: Kevin Brown (2') 1 Ryan Atkins (14') 1 Matthew Russell (18') 1 Tom Lineham (39') 1 Goals: Declan Patton 5/6 (3', 7' pen, 15', 19', 66' pen); Field Goals: Declan Patton (63') 1	1st: 24 – 6; 2nd: 3 – 12	Tries: 1 (26') Corey Oates; 1 (44') James Roberts; 1 (72') David Mead; Goals: 3/3 Jordan Kahu (27', 46', 72')

Halliwell Jones Stadium, Warrington
Attendance: 12,082
Referee: (England) Phil Bentham
Player of the Match: Kevin Brown

Warrington are the first Super League team to beat a NRL team in 5 years, and 8 games.

=== World Club Challenge ===
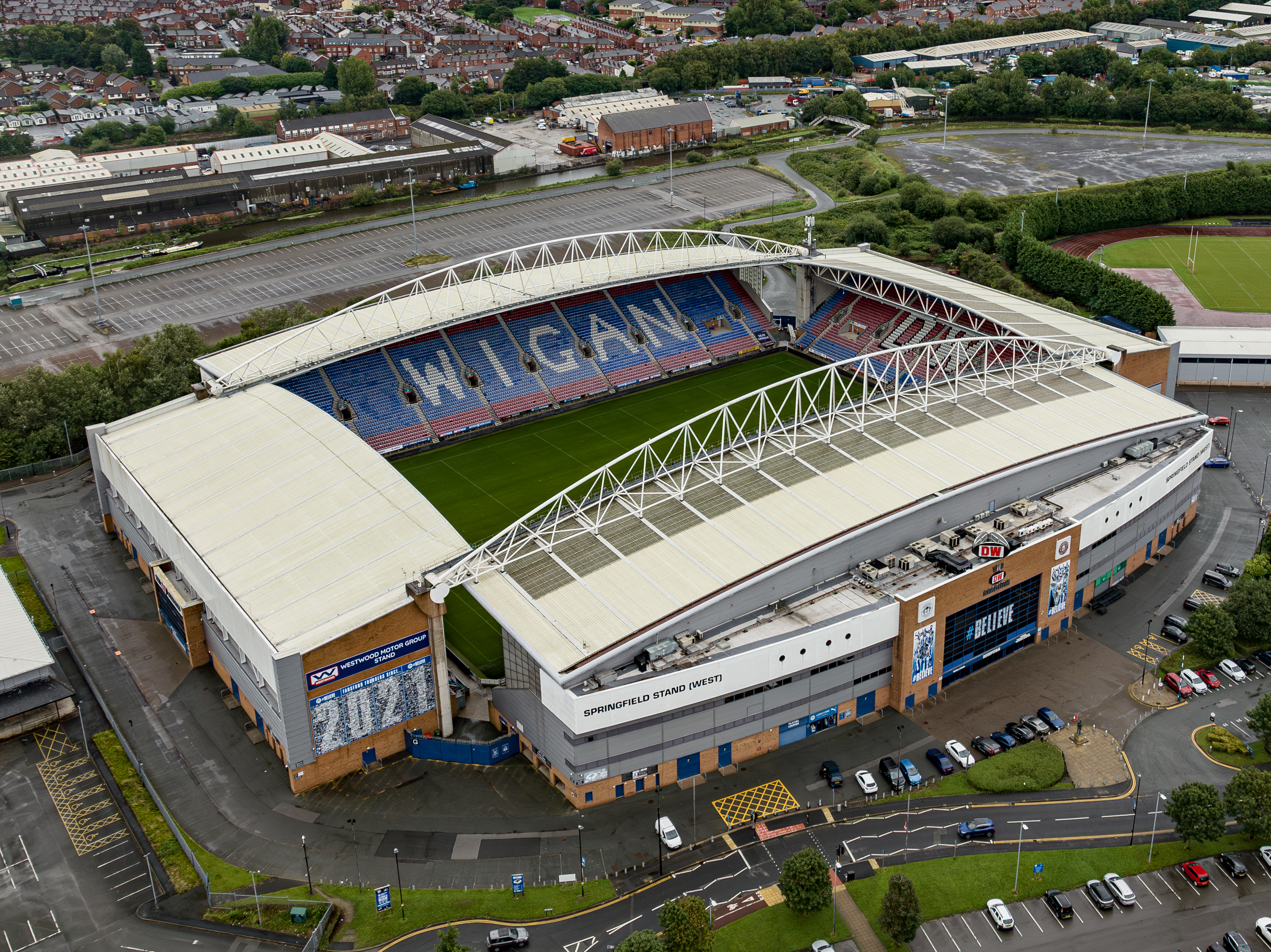
The DW Stadium hosted the match

19 February

Wigan Warriors	22 – 6	Cronulla-Sutherland Sharks
Tries: Joe Burgess (3', 23', 80') 3 Oliver Gildart (45') 1 Goals: Morgan Escare 2/3 (25',46'); Sam Powell 1/1 (80')	1st: 10 – 0; 2nd: 12 – 6	Tries: 1 (59') Jesse Ramien; Goals: 1/1 James Maloney (60')

DW Stadium, Wigan
Attendance: 21,011
Referee: (England) Robert Hicks
Player of the Match: George Williams

This series was the first victory for Super League since the conception of the World Club Series, after the NRL won the last two series.
