= 2018 Super League season results =

Rugby league competition results

Super League XXIII commenced on 1 February 2018, and ended on 13 October. It consisted of 23 regular season games, and 7 rounds of relevant play-offs, which included the Grand Final at Old Trafford.

== Regular season ==
All times stated are GMT (before 25 March) or BST (25 March onwards)

=== Round 1 ===
Home	Score	Away	Match Information
Home	Score	Away	Date and Time	Venue	Referee	Attendance
Warrington Wolves	12–16	Leeds Rhinos	1 February 2018, 19:45	Halliwell Jones Stadium	Phil Bentham	11,241
Hull F.C.	38–12	Huddersfield Giants	1 February 2018, 20:00	KCOM Stadium	Scott Mikalauskas	13,704
Salford Red Devils	12–40	Wigan Warriors	2 February 2018, 19:30	AJ Bell Stadium	Robert Hicks	5,568
St. Helens	46–6	Castleford Tigers	2 February 2018, 19:45	Totally Wicked Stadium	James Child	13,108
Hull KR	6–28	Wakefield Trinity	2 February 2018, 20:00	KCOM Craven Park	Chris Kendall	8,615
Widnes Vikings	40–12	Catalans Dragons	4 February 2018, 15:00	Select Security Stadium	Ben Thaler	4,568

=== Round 2 ===
Home	Score	Away	Match Information
Home	Score	Away	Date and Time	Venue	Referee	Attendance
Huddersfield Giants	20–6	Warrington Wolves	8 February 2018, 19:45	John Smith's Stadium	Ben Thaler	5,104
Leeds Rhinos	20–11	Hull KR	8 February 2018, 19:45	Elland Road	Robert Hicks	16,149
Wakefield Trinity	14–12	Salford Red Devils	9 February 2018, 19:35	The Mobile Rocket Stadium	James Child	4,264
Wigan Warriors	24–10	Hull F.C.	10 February 2018, 08:45	WIN Stadium (Wollongong)	Matt Cecchin	12,416
Catalans Dragons	12–21	St. Helens	10 February 2018, 17:05	Stade Gilbert Brutus	Phil Bentham	8,103
Castleford Tigers	13–12	Widnes Vikings	11 February 2018, 15:30	Mend-A-Hose Jungle	Chris Kendall	8,552

=== Round 3 ===
Home	Score	Away	Match Information
Home	Score	Away	Date and Time	Venue	Referee	Attendance
Salford Red Devils	36–12	Hull KR	23 February 2018, 19:30	AJ Bell Stadium	James Child	2,948
Huddersfield Giants	12–26	St. Helens	23 February 2018, 19:45	John Smith's Stadium	Liam Moore	5,915
Warrington Wolves	16–10	Wigan Warriors	23 February 2018, 19:45	Halliwell Jones Stadium	Ben Thaler	12,012
Castleford Tigers	28–18	Hull F.C.	24 February 2018, 15:15	Mend-A-Hose Jungle	Chris Kendall	9,365
Catalans Dragons	14–16	Wakefield Trinity	24 February 2018, 17:15	Stade Gilbert Brutus	Gareth Hewer	6,872
Widnes Vikings	23–6	Leeds Rhinos	25 February 2018, 15:00	Select Security Stadium	Robert Hicks	5,519

=== Round 4 ===
Home	Score	Away	Match Information
Home	Score	Away	Date and Time	Venue	Referee	Attendance
Hull F.C.	21–12	Warrington Wolves	2 March 2018, 19:45	KCOM Stadium	Ben Thaler	10,051
Wigan Warriors	32–16	Widnes Vikings	2 March 2018, 20:00	DW Stadium	Robert Hicks	10,815
Wakefield Trinity	22–4	Huddersfield Giants	4 March 2018, 15:00 (Note: Game rescheduled from 2 March, due to Storm Emma, which caused severe weather conditions overnight.)	The Mobile Rocket Stadium	Gareth Hewer	4,055
St. Helens	34–2	Salford Red Devils	4 March 2018, 16:00	Totally Wicked Stadium	Scott Mikalauskas	10,008
Hull KR	14–42	Castleford Tigers	1 June 2018, 20:00 (Note: Game rescheduled from 2 March, due to Storm Emma which caused severe weather conditions overnight.)	KCOM Craven Park	James Child	7,074
Leeds Rhinos	25–28	Catalans Dragons	20 June 2018, 19:45	Headingley	Scott Mikalauskas	10,366

=== Round 5 ===
Home	Score	Away	Match Information
Home	Score	Away	Date and Time	Venue	Referee	Attendance
Leeds Rhinos	20–16	Hull F.C.	8 March 2018, 19:45	Emerald Headingley Stadium	Robert Hicks	11,158
Warrington Wolves	12–30	St. Helens	9 March 2018, 19:45	Halliwell Jones Stadium	James Child	12,268
Widnes Vikings	16–28	Huddersfield Giants	9 March 2018, 20:00	Select Security Stadium	Ben Thaler	4,298
Catalans Dragons	18–16	Hull KR	10 March 2018, 17:00	Stade Gilbert Brutus	Scott Mikalauskas	7,342
Wigan Warriors	30–18	Wakefield Trinity	11 March 2018, 15:00	DW Stadium	Chris Kendall	11,455
Castleford Tigers	22–8	Salford Red Devils	11 March 2018, 15:30	Mend-A-Hose Jungle	Liam Moore	8,240

=== Round 6 ===
Home	Score	Away	Match Information
Home	Score	Away	Date and Time	Venue	Referee	Attendance
Huddersfield Giants	6–38	Hull Kingston Rovers	15 March 2018, 19:45	John Smith's Stadium	Ben Thaler	4,612
St. Helens	20–28	Leeds Rhinos	16 March 2018, 19:45	Totally Wicked Stadium	James Child	11,482
Salford Red Devils	24–8	Hull	16 March 2018, 20:00	AJ Bell Stadium	Scott Mikalauskas	2,902
Catalans Dragons	0–26	Warrington Wolves	17 March 2018, 17:00	Stade Gilbert Brutus	Chris Kendall	6,585
Castleford Tigers	19–18	Wigan Warriors	22 June 2018, 19:45 (Note: Game rescheduled from 18 March, because of safety concerns, following heavy snow which fell overnight.)	Mend-A-Hose Jungle	James Child	7,714
Wakefield Trinity	44–22 (Note: Original fixture on 17 March abandoned after 27 minutes, due to heavy snow and severe weather.)	Widnes Vikings	24 June 2018, 15:00	The Mobile Rocket Stadium	Liam Moore	4,589

=== Round 7 ===
Home	Score	Away	Match Information
Home	Score	Away	Date and Time	Venue	Referee	Attendance
Widnes Vikings	24–16	Salford Red Devils	22 March 2018, 19:45	Select Security Stadium	Ben Thaler	4,007
Hull F.C.	42–16	Catalans Dragons	23 March 2018, 19:45	KCOM Stadium	Jack Smith	10,347
Hull KR	6–30	St. Helens	23 March 2018, 19:45	KCOM Craven Park	Liam Moore	7,724
Leeds Rhinos	24–25	Castleford Tigers	23 March 2018, 19:45	Elland Road	Chris Kendall	23,246
Warrington Wolves	34–24	Wakefield Trinity	23 March 2018, 19:45	Halliwell Jones Stadium	James Child	9,154
Wigan Warriors	48–10	Huddersfield Giants	23 March 2018, 20:00	DW Stadium	Scott Mikalauskas	10,641

=== Round 8 (Good Friday/Easter Weekend) ===
Home	Score	Away	Match Information
Home	Score	Away	Date and Time	Venue	Referee	Attendance
Wakefield Trinity	6–11	Castleford Tigers	29 March 2018, 19:45	The Mobile Rocket Stadium	James Child	7,020
Hull KR	22–30	Hull F.C.	30 March 2018, 12:50	KCOM Craven Park	Chris Kendall	12,090
Huddersfield Giants	22–22	Leeds Rhinos	30 March 2018, 15:00	John Smith's Stadium	Jack Smith	7,544
Salford Red Devils	32–16	Catalans Dragons	30 March 2018, 15:00	AJ Bell Stadium	Gareth Hewer	2,328
Warrington Wolves	32–18	Widnes Vikings	30 March 2018, 15:00	Halliwell Jones Stadium	Liam Moore	12,175
St. Helens	21–18	Wigan Warriors	30 March 2018, 15:15	Totally Wicked Stadium	Robert Hicks	17,980

=== Round 9 (Easter Monday) ===
Home	Score	Away	Match Information
Home	Score	Away	Date and Time	Venue	Referee	Attendance
Castleford Tigers	6–18	Warrington Wolves	2 April 2018, 13:30	Mend-A-Hose Jungle	Robert Hicks	6,881
Hull F.C.	27–26	Wakefield Trinity	2 April 2018, 15:00	KCOM Stadium	Liam Moore	11,529
Leeds Rhinos	20–0	Salford Red Devils	2 April 2018, 15:00	Emerald Headingley Stadium	Greg Dolan	10,718
Wigan Warriors	44–6	Hull KR	2 April 2018, 15:00	DW Stadium	Ben Thaler	10,977
Widnes Vikings	6–28	St. Helens	2 April 2018, 15:05	Select Security Stadium	Chris Kendall	6,706
Catalans Dragons	27–6	Huddersfield Giants	2 April 2018, 17:00	Stade Gilbert Brutus	Scott Mikalauskas	8,853

=== Round 10 ===
Home	Score	Away	Match Information
Home	Score	Away	Date and Time	Venue	Referee	Attendance
St. Helens	26–12	Hull F.C.	6 April 2018, 19:45	Totally Wicked Stadium	Robert Hicks	12,408
Salford Red Devils	6–22	Warrington Wolves	7 April 2018, 15:15	AJ Bell Stadium	Gareth Hewer	3,428
Catalans Dragons	23–32	Wigan Warriors	7 April 2018, 17:00	Stade Gilbert Brutus	Liam Moore	8,387
Hull KR	31–12	Widnes Vikings	7 April 2018, 18:00	KCOM Craven Park	James Child	7,260
Wakefield Trinity	26–28	Leeds Rhinos	8 April 2018, 15:00	The Mobile Rocket Stadium	Chris Kendall	6,767
Huddersfield Giants	28–40	Castleford Tigers	8 April 2018, 15:00	John Smith's Stadium	Ben Thaler	5,946

=== Round 11 ===
Home	Score	Away	Match Information
Home	Score	Away	Date and Time	Venue	Referee	Attendance
Widnes Vikings	20–39	Hull F.C.	12 April 2018, 19:45	Select Security Stadium	Chris Kendall	3,733
Leeds Rhinos	8–9	Wigan Warriors	13 April 2018, 19:45	Emerald Headingley Stadium	Ben Thaler	12,221
Warrington Wolves	40–26	Hull KR	14 April 2018, 15:00	Halliwell Jones Stadium	Jack Smith	9,305
Huddersfield Giants	12–30	Salford Red Devils	15 April 2018, 15:00	John Smith's Stadium	James Child	4,385
Wakefield Trinity	24–20	St. Helens	15 April 2018, 15:00	The Mobile Rocket Stadium	Gareth Hewer	5,231
Castleford Tigers	41–0	Catalans Dragons	15 April 2018, 15:30	Mend-A-Hose Jungle	Scott Mikalauskas	7,137

=== Round 12 ===
Home	Score	Away	Match Information
Home	Score	Away	Date and Time	Venue	Referee	Attendance
Hull Kingston Rovers	23–4	Catalans Dragons	15 February 2018, 19:35 (Note: Game played between rounds 2 and 3 due to the involvement of the clubs in round 5 of the Challenge Cup which was played on the same weekend as round 12 of Super League)	KCOM Craven Park	James Child	6,711
Widnes Vikings	10–18	Warrington Wolves	16 February 2018, 19:35	Select Security Stadium	Phil Bentham (Note: Scott Mikalauskas replaced Bentham in the 54th minute, due to injury.)	7,009
Hull F.C.	19–18	Leeds Rhinos	19 April 2018, 19:45	KCOM Stadium	Ben Thaler	11,391
Wigan Warriors	28–12	Castleford Tigers	20 April 2018, 19:45	DW Stadium	Chris Kendall	11,866
St. Helens	66–4	Huddersfield Giants	20 April 2018, 20:00	Totally Wicked Stadium	Scott Mikalauskas	10,278
Salford Red Devils	38–4	Wakefield Trinity	20 April 2018, 20:00	AJ Bell Stadium	James Child	2,686

=== Round 13 ===
Home	Score	Away	Match Information
Home	Score	Away	Date and Time	Venue	Referee	Attendance
Salford Red Devils	10–60	St. Helens	26 April 2018, 19:45	AJ Bell Stadium	Chris Kendall	3,105
Castleford Tigers	24–4	Wakefield Trinity	27 April 2018, 19:45	Mend-A-Hose Jungle	Robert Hicks	7,485
Warrington Wolves	38–4	Huddersfield Giants	27 April 2018, 19:45	Halliwell Jones Stadium	Tom Grant	8,792
Widnes Vikings	24–32	Wigan Warriors	27 April 2018, 20:00	Select Security Stadium	Ben Thaler	5,668
Catalans Dragons	25–24	Hull F.C.	28 April 2018, 17:00	Stade Gilbert Brutus	James Child	8,823
Hull KR	18–20	Leeds Rhinos	29 April 2018, 15:00	MS3 Craven Park	Scott Mikalauskas	9,095

=== Round 14 ===
Home	Score	Away	Match Information
Home	Score	Away	Date and Time	Venue	Referee	Attendance
St. Helens	26–12	Catalans Dragons	3 May 2018, 19:45	Totally Wicked Stadium	Robert Hicks	9,138
Huddersfield Giants	28–18	Widnes Vikings	4 May 2018, 19:45	John Smith's Stadium	Liam Moore	4,645
Leeds Rhinos	22–33	Warrington Wolves	4 May 2018, 19:45	Emerald Headingley	Ben Thaler	11,749
Wigan Warriors	30–0	Salford Red Devils	4 May 2018, 20:00	DW Stadium	Chris Kendall	10,733
Hull F.C.	36–12	Castleford Tigers	5 May 2018, 17:00	KCOM Stadium	Gareth Hewer	13,623
Wakefield Trinity	54–18	Hull KR	6 May 2018, 15:00	The Mobile Rocket Stadium	James Child	5,331

=== Round 15 (Magic Weekend) ===
Home	Score	Away	Match Information
Home	Score	Away	Date and Time	Venue	Referee	Attendance
Widnes Vikings	18–38	St. Helens	19 May 2018, 15:00	St James' Park	Liam Moore	38,881
Wigan Warriors	38–10	Warrington Wolves	19 May 2018, 17:15	St James' Park	Robert Hicks	38,881
Castleford Tigers	38–10	Leeds Rhinos	19 May 2018, 19:30	St James' Park	Chris Kendall	38,881
Salford Red Devils	12–26	Catalans Dragons	20 May 2018, 13:00	St James' Park	Gareth Hewer	25,438
Wakefield Trinity	22–25	Huddersfield Giants	20 May 2018, 15:15	St James' Park	James Child	25,438
Hull Kingston Rovers	22–34	Hull F.C.	20 May 2018, 17:30	St James' Park	Ben Thaler	25,438

=== Round 16 ===
Home	Score	Away	Match Information
Home	Score	Away	Date and Time	Venue	Referee	Attendance
Castleford Tigers	18–40	St. Helens	24 May 2018, 19:45	Mend-A-Hose Jungle	Chris Kendall	6,969
Salford Red Devils	16–24	Huddersfield Giants	25 May 2018, 19:30	AJ Bell Stadium	Liam Moore	2,342
Warrington Wolves	30–12	Hull F.C.	25 May 2018, 19:45	Halliwell Jones Stadium	Gareth Hewer	8,846
Hull KR	24–8	Wigan Warriors	25 May 2018, 20:00	MS3 Craven Park	Ben Thaler	7,222
Widnes Vikings	6–19	Wakefield Trinity	25 May 2018, 20:00	Select Security Stadium	Robert Hicks	3,681
Catalans Dragons	33–20	Leeds Rhinos	26 May 2018, 17:00	Stade Gilbert Brutus	James Child	8,779

=== Round 17 ===
Home	Score	Away	Match Information
Home	Score	Away	Date and Time	Venue	Referee	Attendance
Wakefield Trinity	32–16	Wigan Warriors	7 June 2018, 19:45	The Mobile Rocket Stadium	James Child	4,681
Hull F.C.	45–14	Salford Red Devils	8 June 2018, 19:45	KCOM Stadium	Robert Hicks	10,606
Leeds Rhinos	18–25	Huddersfield Giants	8 June 2018, 19:45	Emerald Headingley Stadium	Liam Moore	11,051
Warrington Wolves	30–34	Castleford Tigers	8 June 2018, 19:45	Halliwell Jones Stadium	Ben Thaler	9,198
St. Helens	26–4	Hull KR	8 June 2018, 20:00	Totally Wicked Stadium	Gareth Hewer	9,405
Catalans Dragons	32–12	Widnes Vikings	9 June 2018, 17:00	Stade Gilbert Brutus	Chris Kendall	9,239

=== Round 18 ===
Home	Score	Away	Match Information
Home	Score	Away	Date and Time	Venue	Referee	Attendance
Salford Red Devils	26–12	Widnes Vikings	14 June 2018, 19:45	AJ Bell Stadium	James Child	2,248
Huddersfield Giants	26–25	Catalans Dragons	15 June 2018, 20:00	John Smith's Stadium	Gareth Hewer	9,121
Leeds Rhinos	22–23	St. Helens	15 June 2018, 19:45	Headingley	Ben Thaler	12,106
Hull F.C.	10–14	Wigan Warriors	16 June 2018, 17:00	KCOM Stadium	Robert Hicks	13,256
Wakefield Trinity	30–32	Warrington Wolves	17 June 2018, 15:00	The Mobile Rocket Stadium	Chris Kendall	5,034
Castleford Tigers	24–24	Hull KR	17 June 2018, 15:30	Mend-A-Hose Jungle	Liam Moore	9,022

=== Round 19 ===
Home	Score	Away	Match Information
Home	Score	Away	Date and Time	Venue	Referee	Attendance
Wigan Warriors	46–8	Leeds Rhinos	28 June 2018, 19:45	DW Stadium	Ben Thaler	10,645
St. Helens	34–30	Wakefield Trinity	29 June 2018, 19:45	Totally Wicked Stadium	James Child	10,080
Warrington Wolves	30–14	Salford Red Devils	29 June 2018, 19:45	Halliwell Jones Stadium	Chris Kendall	9,171
Hull F.C.	31–24	Widnes Vikings	29 June 2018, 20:00	KCOM Stadium	Greg Dolan	10,420
Hull KR	37–10	Huddersfield Giants	29 June 2018, 20:00	KCOM Craven Park	Scott Mikalauskas	7,080
Catalans Dragons	44–16	Castleford Tigers	30 June 2018, 17:00	Stade Gilbert Brutus	Robert Hicks	10,236

=== Round 20 ===
Home	Score	Away	Match Information
Home	Score	Away	Date and Time	Venue	Referee	Attendance
Huddersfield Giants	29–18	Hull F.C.	5 July 2018, 19:45	John Smith's Stadium	Robert Hicks	4,696
Wigan Warriors	13–12	Warrington Wolves	6 July 2018, 19:45	DW Stadium	Chris Kendall	13,249
St. Helens	36–6	Widnes Vikings	6 July 2018, 20:00	Totally Wicked Stadium	Scott Mikalauskas	9,923
Wakefield Trinity	18–35	Catalans Dragons	7 July 2018, 18:30	The Mobile Rocket Stadium	Ben Thaler	5,079
Hull KR	52–22	Salford Red Devils	8 July 2018, 15:00	KCOM Craven Park	Gareth Hewer	7,698
Castleford Tigers	42–10	Leeds Rhinos	8 July 2018, 15:30	Mend-A-Hose Jungle	Liam Moore	9,557

=== Round 21 ===
Home	Score	Away	Match Information
Home	Score	Away	Date and Time	Venue	Referee	Attendance
Huddersfield Giants	20–12	Wigan Warriors	12 July 2018, 19:45	John Smith's Stadium	Gareth Hewer	5,264
Warrington Wolves	22–22	Catalans Dragons	12 July 2018, 19:45	Halliwell Jones Stadium	Ben Thaler	8,807
Hull F.C.	18–34	St. Helens	13 July 2018, 19:45	KCOM Stadium	Liam Moore	11,430
Leeds Rhinos	20–20	Wakefield Trinity	13 July 2018, 20:00	Headingley	Robert Hicks	11,140
Salford Red Devils	6–24	Castleford Tigers	13 July 2018, 20:00	AJ Bell Stadium	Chris Kendall	2,681
Widnes Vikings	24–26	Hull KR	14 July 2018, 15:00	Select Security Stadium	Tom Grant	4,469

=== Round 22 ===
Home	Score	Away	Match Information
Home	Score	Away	Date and Time	Venue	Referee	Attendance
Wigan Warriors	6–14	St. Helens	19 July 2018, 19:45	DW Stadium	Robert Hicks	16,047
Castleford Tigers	18–32	Huddersfield Giants	20 July 2018, 19:45	Mend-A-Hose Jungle	Chris Kendall	5,406
Hull KR	20–34	Warrington Wolves	20 July 2018, 20:00	KCOM Craven Park	Liam Moore	7,045
Leeds Rhinos	34–0	Widnes Vikings	20 July 2018, 20:00	Headingley	James Child	10,977
Catalans Dragons	44–10	Salford Red Devils	21 July 2018, 17:00	Stade Gilbert Brutus	Scott Mikalauskas	8,672
Wakefield Trinity	72–10	Hull F.C.	22 July 2018, 15:00	Beaumont Legal Stadium	Ben Thaler	5,634

=== Round 23 ===
Home	Score	Away	Match Information
Home	Score	Away	Date and Time	Venue	Referee	Attendance
St. Helens	14–12	Warrington Wolves	26 July 2018, 19:45	Totally Wicked Stadium	James Child	12,454
Huddersfield Giants	40–28	Wakefield Trinity	27 July 2018, 19:45	John Smith's Stadium	Robert Hicks	5,697
Hull F.C.	16–20	Hull KR	27 July 2018, 20:00* (Note: Kick off was scheduled for 19:45, but was delayed by 15 minutes due to a thunderstorm.)	KCOM Stadium	Gareth Hewer	17,564
Salford Red Devils	38–22	Leeds Rhinos	27 July 2018, 20:00	AJ Bell Stadium	Tom Grant	2,387
Wigan Warriors	25–20	Catalans Dragons	27 July 2018, 20:00	DW Stadium	Scott Mikalauskas	10,656
Widnes Vikings	24–52	Castleford Tigers	29 July 2018, 15:00	Select Security Stadium	Liam Moore	4,218

- Kick off was scheduled for 19:45, but was delayed by 15 minutes due to a thunderstorm

== Super 8's ==
=== Format ===
After 23 games the league table is frozen and the teams are split up into two of Super 8s. The teams finishing in the top eight go on to contest the Super League Super 8s to determine which teams would go through to the semi-final play-offs to compete for a place in the Grand Final. The teams retain the points scored so far and play each other one more, a total of seven further games per team.

=== Fixtures and results ===
The Super League Super 8s sees the top eight teams from the Super League play seven more games each. Each team's points are carried over, and after seven rounds the top four teams will contest the play off semi-finals, with the team finishing 1st hosting the team in 4th, whilst the team finishing 2nd hosting the 3rd placed team. the 2 winners of these semi-finals will contest the Super League Grand Final at Old Trafford.

=== Round 1 ===
Home	Score	Away	Match Information
Home	Score	Away	Date and Time	Venue	Referee	Attendance
Hull F.C.	13–31	Wakefield Trinity	10 August 2018, 19:45	KCOM Stadium	Jack Smith	10,301
St. Helens	12–16	Huddersfield Giants	10 August 2018, 19:45	Totally Wicked Stadium	Scott Mikalauskas	8,979
Warrington Wolves	56–6	Catalans Dragons	10 August 2018, 19:45	Halliwell Jones Stadium	Ben Thaler	8,032
Wigan Warriors	24–22	Castleford Tigers	10 August 2018, 19:45	DW Stadium	James Child	10,293

=== Round 2 ===
Home	Score	Away	Match Information
Home	Score	Away	Date and Time	Venue	Referee	Attendance
Wakefield Trinity	16–36	St Helens	16 August 2018, 19:45	The Mobile Rocket Stadium	Liam Moore	4,295
Castleford Tigers	28–18	Warrington Wolves	17 August 2018, 19:45	Mend-A-Hose Jungle	Gareth Hewer	7,142
Huddersfield Giants	24–6	Hull F.C.	17 August 2018, 19:45	John Smith's Stadium	Robert Hicks	4,499
Catalans Dragons	6–35	Wigan Warriors	18 August 2018, 17:15	Stade Gilbert Brutus	Greg Dolan	6,739

=== Round 3 ===
Home	Score	Away	Match Information
Home	Score	Away	Date and Time	Venue	Referee	Attendance
Warrington Wolves	80–10	Hull	30 August 2018, 19:45	Halliwell Jones Stadium	Liam Moore	8,101
Huddersfield Giants	16–42	Wakefield Trinity	31 August 2018, 19:45	John Smith's Stadium	Gareth Hewer	4,963
St. Helens	10–30	Wigan Warriors	31 August 2018, 19:45	Totally Wicked Stadium	Chris Kendall	14,061
Castleford Tigers	36–4	Catalans Dragons	1 September 2018, 19:45	Mend-A-Hose Jungle	Greg Dolan	7,658

=== Round 4 ===
Home	Score	Away	Match Information
Home	Score	Away	Date and Time	Venue	Referee	Attendance
Wigan Warriors	25–10	Wakefield Trinity	6 September 2018, 19:45	DW Stadium	Ben Thaler	9,959
Hull F.C.	8–28	Castleford Tigers	7 September 2018, 19:45	KCOM Stadium	Gareth Hewer	10,570
Warrington Wolves	26–24	Huddersfield Giants	7 September 2018, 19:45	Halliwell Jones Stadium	James Child	9,076
Catalans Dragons	22–26	St. Helens	8 September 2018, 17:15	Stade Gilbert Brutus	Liam Moore	7,190

=== Round 5 ===
Home	Score	Away	Match Information
Home	Score	Away	Date and Time	Venue	Referee	Attendance
Castleford Tigers	44–12	Huddersfield Giants	13 September 2018, 19:45	Mend-A-Hose Jungle	Ben Thaler	7,279
St. Helens	38–12	Hull F.C.	14 September 2018, 19:45	Totally Wicked Stadium	Chris Kendall	9,348
Wakefield Trinity	34–22	Catalans Dragons	14 September 2018, 19:45	The Mobile Rocket Stadium	Scott Mikalauskas	4,030
Wigan Warriors	26–6	Warrington Wolves	14 September 2018, 19:45	DW Stadium	Robert Hicks	12,372

=== Round 6 ===
Home	Score	Away	Match Information
Home	Score	Away	Date and Time	Venue	Referee	Attendance
Huddersfield Giants	6–13	Wigan Warriors	20 September 2018, 19:45	John Smith's Stadium*	Greg Dolan	4,197
Castleford Tigers	42–10	Wakefield Trinity	21 September 2018, 19:45	Mend-A-Hose Jungle	Gareth Hewer	7,860
Warrington Wolves	14–34	St. Helens	22 September 2018, 15:15	Halliwell Jones Stadium	Chris Kendall	10,747
Hull F.C.	20–26	Catalans Dragons	22 September 2018, 17:00	KCOM Stadium	M Griffiths	10,467

- Game moved to Huddersfield, due to Wigan Athletic's fixture with Bristol City, now being played on the same day.

=== Round 7 ===
Home	Score	Away	Match Information
Home	Score	Away	Date and Time	Venue	Referee	Attendance
St. Helens	26–0	Castleford Tigers	28 September 2018, 19:45	Totally Wicked Stadium	Scott Mikalauskas	9,813
Wakefield Trinity	23–36	Warrington Wolves	28 September 2018, 19:45	The Mobile Rocket Stadium	Marcus Griffiths	4,140
Wigan Warriors	14–12	Hull F.C.	28 September 2018, 19:45	DW Stadium	Liam Moore	11,189
Catalans Dragons	22-12	Huddersfield Giants	29 September 2018, 17:15	Stade Gilbert Brutus	Greg Dolan	7,304
