= 2017 Super League season results =

Rugby league competition results

Super League XXII commenced on 9 February 2017 and ended on 7 October with the Super League Grand Final. It consisted of 23 regular season games and 7 rounds of relevant play-offs following which there were two play-off semi-finals and the grand final.

== Regular season ==
=== Round 1 ===
| Home | Score | Away | Match Information |
| Home | Score | Away | Date and Time | Venue | Referee | Attendance |
|---|---|---|---|---|---|---|
| St. Helens | 6–4 | Leeds Rhinos | 9 February 20:00 GMT | Totally Wicked Stadium | Phil Bentham | 12,208 |
| Castleford Tigers | 44–16 | Leigh Centurions | 10 February 20:00 GMT | Wheldon Road | Robert Hicks | 8,522 |
| Widnes Vikings | 16–28 | Huddersfield Giants | 10 February 20:00 GMT | Select Security Stadium | Jack Smith | 5,031 |
| Salford Red Devils | 16–26 | Wigan Warriors | 11 February 13:15 GMT | AJ Bell Stadium | Ben Thaler | 6,527 |
| Catalans Dragons | 20–12 | Warrington Wolves | 11 February 17:00 GMT | Stade Gilbert Brutus | James Child | 8,842 |
| Wakefield Trinity | 8–12 | Hull | 12 February 15:00 GMT | Belle Vue | Chris Campbell | 7,027 |

=== Rearranged Round 11 ===
This round is played by the teams entering the Challenge Cup in the 5th round which coincides with the dates for Round 11.

| Home | Score | Away | Match Information |
| Home | Score | Away | Date and Time | Venue | Referee | Attendance |
|---|---|---|---|---|---|---|
| Huddersfield Giants | 20–30 | Salford Red Devils | 16 February 2017 20:00 GMT | John Smith's Stadium | James Child | 6,017 |
| Leigh Centurions | 14–17 | Leeds Rhinos | 17 February 2017 20:00 GMT | Leigh Sports Village | Jack Smith | 6,692 |

=== Round 2 ===
| Home | Score | Away | Match Information |
| Home | Score | Away | Date and Time | Venue | Referee | Attendance |
|---|---|---|---|---|---|---|
| Hull | 14–16 | Catalans Dragons | 23 February 20:00 GMT | KCOM Stadium | Robert Hicks | 13,544 |
| Huddersfield Giants | 24–16 | Wakefield Trinity | 24 February 20:00 GMT | John Smith's Stadium | Chris Kendall | 6,337 |
| Leeds Rhinos | 20–14 | Salford Red Devils | 24 February 20:00 GMT | Headingley Carnegie | Chris Campbell | 14,575 |
| Leigh Centurions | 24–16 | St. Helens | 24 February 20:00 GMT | Leigh Sports Village | Ben Thaler | 9,012 |
| Warrington Wolves | 22–30 | Castleford Tigers | 24 February 20:00 GMT | Halliwell Jones Stadium | Phil Bentham | 11,374 |
| Widnes Vikings | 26–28 | Wigan Warriors | 24 February 20:00 GMT | Select Security Stadium (Note: Game originally scheduled to take place at the DW Stadium but was moved to Widnes due to a waterlogged pitch at Wigan.) | James Child | 6,561 |

=== Round 3 ===
| Home | Score | Away | Match Information |
| Home | Score | Away | Date and Time | Venue | Referee | Attendance |
|---|---|---|---|---|---|---|
| Castleford Tigers | 66–10 | Leeds Rhinos | 2 March 2017 20:00 GMT | Wheldon Road | Ben Thaler | 11,500 |
| Huddersfield Giants | 8–48 | Hull | 2 March 2017 20:00 GMT | John Smith's Stadium | Phil Bentham | 5,176 |
| St. Helens | 12–16 | Wakefield Trinity | 3 March 2017 20:00 GMT | Totally Wicked Stadium | James Child | 9,040 |
| Wigan Warriors | 20–0 | Leigh Centurions | 3 March 2017 20:00 GMT | DW Stadium | Robert Hicks | 15,699 |
| Salford Red Devils | 24–14 | Warrington Wolves | 4 March 2017 15:00 GMT | AJ Bell Stadium | Jack Smith | 5,428 |
| Catalans Dragons | 14–14 | Widnes Vikings | 4 March 2017 17:00 GMT | Stade Gilbert Brutus | Chris Kendall | 7,254 |

=== Round 4 ===
| Home | Score | Away | Match Information |
| Home | Score | Away | Date and Time | Venue | Referee | Attendance |
|---|---|---|---|---|---|---|
| Warrington Wolves | 16–38 | Wigan Warriors | 9 March 2017 20:00 GMT | Halliwell Jones Stadium | Ben Thaler | 11,250 |
| Hull | 24–14 | St. Helens | 10 March 2017 20:00 GMT | KCOM Stadium | Phil Bentham | 11,587 |
| Leeds Rhinos | 46–10 | Catalans Dragons | 10 March 2017 20:00 GMT | Headingley Carnegie | James Child | 13,208 |
| Leigh Centurions | 30–0 | Huddersfield Giants | 10 March 2017 20:00 GMT | Leigh Sports Village | Chris Campbell | 6,001 |
| Wakefield Trinity | 24–22 | Salford Red Devils | 12 March 2017 15:00 GMT | Beaumont Legal Stadium | Robert Hicks | 4,946 |
| Widnes Vikings | 0–34 | Castleford Tigers | 12 March 2017 15:00 GMT | Select Security Stadium | Jack Smith | 6,396 |

=== Round 5 ===
| Home | Score | Away | Match Information |
| Home | Score | Away | Date and Time | Venue | Referee | Attendance |
|---|---|---|---|---|---|---|
| Leigh Centurions | 22–8 | Warrington Wolves | 16 March 2017 20:00 BST | Leigh Sports Village | Ben Thaler | 7,011 |
| Hull | 32–12 | Widnes Vikings | 17 March 2017 20:00 BST | KCOM Stadium | Chris Campbell | 10,814 |
| Leeds Rhinos | 38–14 | Wakefield Trinity | 17 March 2017 20:00 BST | Headingley Carnegie | Jack Smith | 14,411 |
| Catalans Dragons | 24–28 | St. Helens | 18 March 2017 17:00 BST | Stade Gilbert Brutus | Robert Hicks | 8,158 |
| Salford Red Devils | 13–12 | Castleford Tigers | 18 March 2017 15:00 BST | AJ Bell Stadium | Phil Bentham | 5,221 |
| Wigan Warriors | 16–16 | Huddersfield Giants | 18 March 2017 15:00 BST | DW Stadium | Chris Kendall | 12,704 |

=== Round 6 ===
| Home | Score | Away | Match Information |
| Home | Score | Away | Date and Time | Venue | Referee | Attendance |
|---|---|---|---|---|---|---|
| Wakefield Trinity | 28–24 | Leigh Centurions | 23 March 2017 20:00 GMT | Beaumont Legal Stadium | Chris Campbell | 4,592 |
| Huddersfield Giants | 12–28 | Leeds Rhinos | 24 March 2017 20:00 GMT | John Smith's Stadium | Ben Thaler | 8,666 |
| St. Helens | 31–6 | Warrington Wolves | 24 March 2017 20:00 GMT | Totally Wicked Stadium | James Child | 11,598 |
| Widnes Vikings | 10–46 | Salford Red Devils | 24 March 2017 20:00 GMT | Select Security Stadium | Chris Kendall | 5,565 |
| Wigan Warriors | 20–22 | Hull | 24 March 2017 20:00 GMT | DW Stadium | Phil Bentham | 12,319 |
| Castleford Tigers | 43–26 | Catalans Dragons | 26 March 2017 15:30 GMT | Mend-A-Hose Jungle | Jack Smith | 8,126 |

=== Round 7 ===
| Home | Score | Away | Match Information |
| Home | Score | Away | Date and Time | Venue | Referee | Attendance |
|---|---|---|---|---|---|---|
| Salford Red Devils | 22–14 | St. Helens | 30 March 2017 20:00 BST | AJ Bell Stadium | James Child | 3,640 |
| Castleford Tigers | 52–16 | Huddersfield Giants | 31 March 2017 20:00 BST | Mend-A-Hose Jungle | Chris Kendall | 8,035 |
| Leeds Rhinos | 26–18 | Wigan Warriors | 31 March 2017 20:00 BST | Headingley Carnegie | Ben Thaler | 17,030 |
| Warrington Wolves | 22–22 | Hull | 1 April 2017 15:00 BST | Halliwell Jones Stadium | Jack Smith | 10,676 |
| Leigh Centurions | 24–37 | Widnes Vikings | 1 April 2017 16:00 BST | Leigh Sports Village | Robert Hicks | 6,195 |
| Catalans Dragons | 18–38 | Wakefield Trinity | 1 April 2017 18:00 BST | Stade Gilbert Brutus | Gareth Hewer | 7,931 |

=== Round 8 ===
| Home | Score | Away | Match Information |
| Home | Score | Away | Date and Time | Venue | Referee | Attendance |
|---|---|---|---|---|---|---|
| Wigan Warriors | 10–27 | Castleford Tigers | 6 April 2017 20:00 BST | DW Stadium | Robert Hicks | 12,423 |
| Hull | 18–54 | Salford Red Devils | 7 April 2017 20:00 BST | KCOM Stadium | Gareth Hewer | 11,016 |
| Leigh Centurions | 26–37 | Catalans Dragons | 7 April 2017 20:00 BST | Leigh Sports Village | Jack Smith | 5,612 |
| St. Helens | 14–14 | Huddersfield Giants | 7 April 2017 20:00 BST | Totally Wicked Stadium | Chris Campbell | 9,080 |
| Wakefield Trinity | 30–4 | Widnes Vikings | 7 April 2017 20:00 BST | Beaumont Legal Stadium | Chris Kendall | 4,214 |
| Warrington Wolves | 25–14 | Leeds Rhinos | 7 April 2017 20:00 BST | Halliwell Jones Stadium | James Child | 10,035 |

=== Round 9 (Easter/Good Friday) ===
| Home | Score | Away | Match Information |
| Home | Score | Away | Date and Time | Venue | Referee | Attendance |
|---|---|---|---|---|---|---|
| Huddersfield Giants | 22–29 | Catalans Dragons | 12 April 20:00 BST | John Smith's Stadium | Robert Hicks | 4,973 |
| Widnes Vikings | 10–19 | Warrington Wolves | 13 April 20:00 BST | Select Security Stadium | Phil Bentham | 8,279 |
| Wigan Warriors | 29–18 | St. Helens | 14 April 12:15 BST | DW Stadium | Ben Thaler | 23,390 |
| Castleford Tigers | 42–24 | Wakefield Trinity | 14 April 14:30 | Mend-A-Hose Jungle | Chris Kendall | 10,349 |
| Hull | 24–52 | Leeds Rhinos | 14 April 15:00 BST | KCOM Stadium | James Child | 15,487 |
| Salford Red Devils | 12–6 | Leigh Centurions | 14 April 15:00 BST | AJ Bell Stadium | Jack Smith | 5,834 |

=== Round 10 (Easter Monday) ===
| Home | Score | Away | Match Information |
| Home | Score | Away | Date and Time | Venue | Referee | Attendance |
|---|---|---|---|---|---|---|
| Wakefield Trinity | 10–16 | Wigan Warriors | 17 April 2017 14:45 BST | Beaumont Legal Stadium | Jack Smith | 4,640 |
| Leeds Rhinos | 42–22 | Widnes Vikings | 14 April 2017 15:00 BST | Headingley Carnegie | Scott Mikalauskas | 15,408 |
| Leigh Centurions | 10–24 | Hull | 14 April 2017 15:00 BST | Leigh Sports Village | Gareth Hewer | 6,296 |
| St. Helens | 26–22 | Castleford Tigers | 14 April 2017 15:00 BST | Totally Wicked Stadium | Chris Campbell | 12,499 |
| Warrington Wolves | 26–24 | Huddersfield Giants | 14 April 2017 15:00 BST | Halliwell Jones Stadium | Ben Thaler | 10,111 |
| Catalans Dragons | 38–6 | Salford Red Devils | 14 April 2017 18:00 BST | Stade Gilbert Brutus | Phil Bentham | 10,804 |

=== Round 11 ===
| Home | Score | Away | Match Information |
| Home | Score | Away | Date and Time | Venue | Referee | Attendance |
|---|---|---|---|---|---|---|
| Widnes Vikings | 16–14 | St. Helens | 21 April 2017 20:00 BST | Select Security Stadium | Chris Kendall | 6,171 |
| Warrington Wolves | 22–20 | Wakefield Trinity | 22 April 2017 15:00 BST | Halliwell Jones Stadium | Phil Bentham | 9,152 |
| Hull | 26–24 | Castleford Tigers | 23 April 2017 15:00 BST | KCOM Stadium | Robert Hicks | 12,801 |
| Wigan Warriors | 42–22 | Catalans Dragons | 23 April 2017 15:00 BST | DW Stadium | Gareth Hewer | 11,637 |

=== Round 12 ===
| Home | Score | Away | Match Information |
| Home | Score | Away | Date and Time | Venue | Referee | Attendance |
|---|---|---|---|---|---|---|
| Leeds Rhinos | 12–31 | Huddersfield Giants | 27 April 2017 20:00 BST | Headingley Carnegie | Chris Kendall | 13,169 |
| Hull | 34–10 | Warrington Wolves | 28 April 2017 20:00 BST | KCOM Stadium | James Child | 10,734 |
| St. Helens | 28–6 | Leigh Centurions | 28 April 2017 20:00 BST | Totally Wicked Stadium | Gareth Hewer | 10,268 |
| Castleford Tigers | 54–4 | Wigan Warriors | 29 April 2017 15:00 BST | Mend-A-Hose Jungle | Robert Hicks | 9,333 |
| Salford Red Devils | 30–10 | Widnes Vikings | 30 April 2017 15:00 BST | AJ Bell Stadium | Ben Thaler | 3,128 |
| Wakefield Trinity | 30–10 | Catalans Dragons | 30 April 2017 18:00 BST | Beaumont Legal Stadium | Phil Bentham | 4,017 |

=== Round 13 ===
| Home | Score | Away | Match Information |
| Home | Score | Away | Date and Time | Venue | Referee | Attendance |
|---|---|---|---|---|---|---|
| Huddersfield Giants | 21–26 | Castleford Tigers | 4 May 2017 20:00 BST | John Smith's Stadium | Ben Thaler | 5,566 |
| Warrington Wolves | 40–18 | St. Helens | 5 May 2017 20:00 BST | Halliwell Jones Stadium | Phil Bentham | 11,681 |
| Wigan Warriors | 16–31 | Salford Red Devils | 5 May 2017 20:00 BST | DW Stadium | Chris Campbell | 11,861 |
| Catalans Dragons | 24–30 | Leeds Rhinos | 6 May 2017 17:00 BST | Stade Gilbert Brutus | Jack Smith | 8,759 |
| Leigh Centurions | 26–40 | Wakefield Trinity | 6 May 2017 18:00 BST | Leigh Sports Village | Chris Kendall | 4,938 |
| Widnes Vikings | 22–33 | Hull | 7 May 2017 15:00 BST | Select Security Stadium | Gareth Hewer | 5,082 |

=== Round 14 (Magic Weekend) ===
| Home | Score | Away | Match Information |
| Home | Score | Away | Date and Time | Venue | Referee | Attendance |
|---|---|---|---|---|---|---|
| Widnes Vikings | 12–34 | Wakefield Trinity | 20 May 2017 14:30 BST | St James' Park | Chris Kendall | 35,361 |
| Hull | 0–45 | St. Helens | 20 May 2017 16:45 BST | St James' Park | Robert Hicks | 35,361 |
| Wigan Warriors | 24–24 | Warrington Wolves | 20 May 2017 19:00 BST | St James' Park | Ben Thaler | 35,361 |
| Catalans Dragons | 10–18 | Huddersfield Giants | 21 May 2017 13:00 BST | St James' Park | Chris Campbell | 30,046 |
| Leigh Centurions | 22–36 | Salford Red Devils | 21 May 2017 15:15 BST | St James' Park | James Child | 30,046 |
| Leeds Rhinos | 18-29 | Castleford Tigers | 21 May 2017 17:30 BST | St James' Park | Phil Bentham | 30,046 |

=== Round 15 ===
| Home | Score | Away | Match Information |
| Home | Score | Away | Date and Time | Venue | Referee | Attendance |
|---|---|---|---|---|---|---|
| St. Helens | 22–19 | Wigan Warriors | 25 May 2017 20:00 BST | Totally Wicked Stadium | Phil Bentham | 13,138 |
| Castleford Tigers | 32–22 | Widnes Vikings | 26 May 2017 20:00 BST | Mend-A-Hose Jungle | Chris Campbell | 7,648 |
| Hull | 22–26 | Leigh Centurions | 26 May 2017 20:00 BST | KCOM Stadium | Ben Thaler | 10,222 |
| Leeds Rhinos | 40–0 | Warrington Wolves | 26 May 2017 20:00 | Headingley Stadium | James Child | 14,974 |
| Salford Red Devils | 50–12 | Catalans Dragons | 26 May 2017 20:00 BST | AJ Bell Stadium | Robert Hicks | 4,827 |
| Wakefield Trinity | 28–26 | Huddersfield Giants | 26 May 2017 20:00 BST | Beaumont Legal Stadium | Chris Kendall | 4,462 |

=== Round 16 ===
| Home | Score | Away | Match Information |
| Home | Score | Away | Date and Time | Venue | Referee | Attendance |
|---|---|---|---|---|---|---|
| Warrington Wolves | 12–38 | Salford Red Devils | 29 May 2017 15:00 BST | Halliwell Jones Stadium | Phil Bentham | 10,684 |
| Widnes Vikings | 28–20 | Leeds Rhinos | 29 May 2017 15:00 BST | Select Security Stadium | Scott Mikalauskas | 5,518 |
| Wigan Warriors | 30–42 | Wakefield Trinity | 29 May 2017 15:00 | DW Stadium | Chris Campbell | 13,110 |
| Leigh Centurions | 0–38 | Castleford Tigers | 29 May 2017 16:00 BST | Leigh Sports Village | Chris Kendall | 5,905 |
| Catalans Dragons | 23–18 | Hull | 29 May 2017 19:00 BST | Stade Gilbert Brutus | James Child | 8,439 |

=== Round 17 ===
| Home | Score | Away | Match Information |
| Home | Score | Away | Date and Time | Venue | Referee | Attendance |
|---|---|---|---|---|---|---|
| Leeds Rhinos | 22–14 | Leigh Centurions | 2 June 2017 20:00 BST | Headingley Rugby Stadium | James Child | 13,445 |
| Hull | 39–26 | Wigan Warriors | 3 June 2017 17:00 BST | KCOM Stadium | Phil Bentham | 10,333 |
| Huddersfield Giants | 44–4 | Warrington Wolves | 4 June 2017 15:00 BST | John Smiths Stadium | Chris Kendall | 5,362 |
| Salford Red Devils | 24–34 | Wakefield Trinity | 4 June 2017 15:00 BST | AJ Bell Stadium | Robert Hicks | 3,227 |
| Widnes Vikings | 26–6 | Catalans Dragons | 4 June 2017 15:00 BST | Select Security Stadium | Ben Thaler | 4,253 |
| Castleford Tigers | 16–12 | St. Helens | 4 June 2017 15:30 BST | Mend-A-Hose Jungle | Chris Campbell | 8,550 |

=== Round 18 ===
| Home | Score | Away | Match Information |
| Home | Score | Away | Date and Time | Venue | Referee | Attendance |
|---|---|---|---|---|---|---|
| Leigh Centurions | 50–34 | Wigan Warriors | 8 June 2017 20:00 BST | Leigh Sports Village | Robert Hicks | 7,080 |
| Salford Red Devils | 10–34 | Hull | 9 June 2017 20:00 BST | AJ Bell Stadium | Ben Thaler | 2,678 |
| St. Helens | 26–10 | Widnes Vikings | 9 June 2017 20:00 BST | Totally Wicked Stadium | Scott Mikalauskas | 10,474 |
| Catalans Dragons | 12–56 | Huddersfield Giants | 10 June 2017 17:00 BST | Stade Gilbert Brutus | Chris Kendall | 9,169 |
| Wakefield Trinity | 16–18 | Leeds Rhinos | 10 June 2017 19:00 BST | Beaumont Legal Stadium | Phil Bentham | 7,183 |
| Castleford Tigers | 36–16 | Warrington Wolves | 11 June 2017 15:00 BST | Mend-A-Hose Jungle | James Child | 8,577 |

=== Rearranged Round 16 ===
Original match (29 May) postponed due to Huddersfield Town's play off final at Wembley Stadium

| Home | Score | Away | Match Information |
| Home | Score | Away | Date and Time | Venue | Referee | Attendance |
|---|---|---|---|---|---|---|
| Huddersfield Giants | 24–16 | St. Helens | 16 June 2017 20:00 BST | John Smiths Stadium | James Child | 5,660 |

=== Round 19 ===
| Home | Score | Away | Match Information |
| Home | Score | Away | Date and Time | Venue | Referee | Attendance |
|---|---|---|---|---|---|---|
| Widnes Vikings | 36–10 | Leigh Centurions | 22 June 2017 20:00 BST | Select Security Stadium | James Child | 5,604 |
| Huddersfield Giants | 19–19 | Wigan Warriors | 23 June 2017 20:00 BST | John Smith's Stadium | Gareth Hewer | 5,718 |
| Hull | 40–18 | Wakefield Trinity | 23 June 2017 20:00 BST | KCOM Stadium | Chris Kendall | 10,895 |
| Leeds Rhinos | 12–23 | Castleford Tigers | 23 June 2017 20:00 BST | Headingley Rugby Stadium | Robert Hicks | 18,029 |
| St. Helens | 25–24 | Salford Red Devils | 23 June 2017 20:00 BST | Totally Wicked Stadium | Scott Mikalauskas | 10,001 |
| Warrington Wolves | 24–16 | Catalans Dragons | 24 June 2017 15:00 | Halliwell Jones Stadium | Phil Bentham | 9,798 |

=== Round 20 ===
| Home | Score | Away | Match Information |
| Home | Score | Away | Date and Time | Venue | Referee | Attendance |
|---|---|---|---|---|---|---|
| Leeds Rhinos | 24–22 | St. Helens | 29 June 2017 20:00 BST | Headingley Rugby Stadium | James Child | 13,262 |
| Castleford Tigers | 24–22 | Hull F.C. | 30 June 2017 20:00 BST | Mend-A-Hose Jungle | Chris Kendall | 8,371 |
| Catalans Dragons | 40–36 | Leigh Centurions | 1 July 2017 17:00 BST | Stade Gilbert Brutus | Gareth Hewer | 8,728 |
| Wakefield Trinity | 26–12 | Warrington Wolves | 1 July 2017 18:30 BST | Beaumont Legal Stadium | Robert Hicks | 4,829 |
| Salford Red Devils | 36–20 | Huddersfield Giants | 2 July 2017 15:00 BST | AJ Bell Stadium | Phil Bentham | 3,718 |
| Wigan Warriors | 28–12 | Widnes Vikings | 2 July 2017 15:00 BST | DW Stadium | Scott Mikalauskas | 12,758 |

=== Round 21 ===
| Home | Score | Away | Match Information |
| Home | Score | Away | Date and Time | Venue | Referee | Attendance |
|---|---|---|---|---|---|---|
| Wakefield Trinity | 24–25 | Castleford Tigers | 6 July 2017 20:00 BST | Beaumont Legal Stadium | Chris Kendall | 6,430 |
| Huddersfield Giants | 40–0 | Widnes Vikings | 7 July 2017 20:00 BST | John Smiths Stadium | Gareth Hewer | 5,253 |
| St. Helens | 19–12 | Hull | 7 July 2017 20:00 BST | Totally Wicked Stadium | Phil Bentham | 9,910 |
| Warrington Wolves | 50–10 | Leigh Centurions | 7 July 2017 20:00 BST | Halliwell Jones Stadium | Scott Mikalauskas | 10,597 |
| Catalans Dragons | 10–32 | Wigan Warriors | 8 July 2017 17:00 BST | Stade Gilbert Brutus | Robert Hicks | 9,810 |
| Salford Red Devils | 24–50 | Leeds Rhinos | 9 July 2017 15:00 BST | AJ Bell Stadium | James Child | 5,056 |

=== Round 22 ===
| Home | Score | Away | Match Information |
| Home | Score | Away | Date and Time | Venue | Referee | Attendance |
|---|---|---|---|---|---|---|
| Wigan Warriors | 10–16 | Warrington Wolves | 13 July 2017 20:00 BST | DW Stadium | James Child | 12,790 |
| Castleford Tigers | 38–14 | Salford Red Devils | 14 July 2017 20:00 BST | Mend-A-Hose Jungle | Phil Bentham | 7,094 |
| Huddersfield Giants | 26–4 | Leigh Centurions | 14 July 2017 20:00 BST | John Smiths Stadium | Scott Mikalauskas | 5,535 |
| Leeds Rhinos | 10–7 | Hull | 14 July 2017 20:00 BST | Headingley Rugby Stadium | Robert Hicks | 16,938 |
| Widnes Vikings | 8–36 | Wakefield Trinity | 14 July 2017 20:00 BST | Select Security Stadium | Chris Kendall | 4,977 |
| St. Helens | 46–28 | Catalans Dragons | 16 July 2017 15:00 BST | Totally Wicked Stadium | Ben Thaler | 10,024 |

=== Round 23 ===
| Home | Score | Away | Match Information |
| Home | Score | Away | Date and Time | Venue | Referee | Attendance |
|---|---|---|---|---|---|---|
| Warrington Wolves | 22–6 | Widnes Vikings | 20 July 2017 20:00 BST | Halliwell Jones Stadium | Robert Hicks | 9,895 |
| Hull | 14–10 | Huddersfield Giants | 21 July 2017 20:00 BST | KCOM Stadium | Chris Kendall | 11,467 |
| Leigh Centurions | 25–0 | Salford Red Devils | 21 July 2017 15:00 BST | Leigh Sports Village | Jack Smith | 7,002 |
| Wigan Warriors | 34–0 | Leeds Rhinos | 21 July 2017 20:00 BST | DW Stadium | Ben Thaler | 15,119 |
| Catalans Dragons | 24–32 | Castleford Tigers | 22 July 2017 17:00 BST | Stade Gilbert Brutus | Phil Bentham | 8,657 |
| Wakefield Trinity | 16–41 | St. Helens | 23 July 2017 15:00 BST | Beaumont Legal Stadium | James Child | 5,820 |

== Super 8s ==
=== Round 1 ===
| Home | Score | Away | Match Information |
| Home | Score | Away | Date and Time | Venue | Referee | Attendance |
|---|---|---|---|---|---|---|
| Castleford Tigers | 12–26 | St. Helens | 3 August 2017, 20:00 | Mend-A-Hose Jungle | Robert Hicks | 6,849 |
| Huddersfield Giants | 36–6 | Wakefield Trinity | 4 August 2017, 20:00 | John Smith's Stadium | Tom Grant | 5,429 |
| Hull | 32–18 | Salford Red Devils | 4 August 2017, 20:00 | KCOM Stadium | Jack Smith | 10,239 |
| Leeds Rhinos | 32–16 | Wigan Warriors | 4 August 2017, 20:00 | Headingley Carnegie | Ben Thaler | 13,579 |

=== Round 2 ===
| Home | Score | Away | Match Information |
| Home | Score | Away | Date and Time | Venue | Referee | Attendance |
|---|---|---|---|---|---|---|
| Wakefield Trinity | 38–6 | Leeds Rhinos | 10 August 2017, 20:00 | Beaumont Legal Stadium | Ben Thaler | 5,607 |
| Salford Red Devils | 4–23 | Castleford Tigers | 11 August 2017, 20:00 | AJ Bell Stadium | Chris Kendall | 2,811 |
| St. Helens | 6–8 | Hull | 11 August 2017, 20:00 | Totally Wicked Stadium | James Child | 10,338 |
| Wigan Warriors | 18–4 | Huddersfield Giants | 11 August 2017, 20:00 | DW Stadium | Phil Bentham | 10,619 |

=== Round 3 ===
| Home | Score | Away | Match Information |
| Home | Score | Away | Date and Time | Venue | Referee | Attendance |
|---|---|---|---|---|---|---|
| Castleford Tigers | 45–20 | Wakefield Trinity | 17 August 2017, 20:00 | Mend-A-Hose Jungle | James Child | 11,235 |
| Hull | 18–46 | Huddersfield Giants | 18 August 2017, 20:00 | KCOM Stadium | Scott Mikalauskas | 10,535 |
| Leeds Rhinos | 16–14 | St. Helens | 18 August 2017, 20:00 | Headingley Carnegie | Ben Thaler | 16,326 |
| Wigan Warriors | 42–6 | Salford Red Devils | 18 August 2017, 20:00 | DW Stadium | Chris Kendall | 11,229 |

=== Round 4 ===
| Home | Score | Away | Match Information |
| Home | Score | Away | Date and Time | Venue | Referee | Attendance |
|---|---|---|---|---|---|---|
| Leeds Rhinos | 38–26 | Hull | 31 August 2017, 20:00 | Headingley Carnegie | James Child | 13,219 |
| Huddersfield Giants | 16–24 | Castleford Tigers | 1 September 2017, 20:00 | John Smith's Stadium | Scott Mikalauskas | 6,284 |
| Salford Red Devils | 18–43 | Wakefield Trinity | 1 September 2017, 20:00 | AJ Bell Stadium | Phil Bentham | 2,489 |
| St. Helens | 16–26 | Wigan Warriors | 1 September 2017, 20:00 | Totally Wicked Stadium | Robert Hicks | 15,248 |

=== Round 5 ===
| Home | Score | Away | Match Information |
| Home | Score | Away | Date and Time | Venue | Referee | Attendance |
|---|---|---|---|---|---|---|
| Wakefield Trinity | 16–18 | St. Helens | 7 September 2017, 20:00 | Beaumont Legal Stadium | Ben Thaler | 4,837 |
| Castleford Tigers | 38–24 | Leeds Rhinos | 8 September 2017, 20:00 | Mend-A-Hose Jungle | Jack Smith | 9,557 |
| Hull | 22–30 | Wigan Warriors | 8 September 2017, 20:00 | KCOM Stadium | Robert Hicks | 11,291 |
| Salford Red Devils | 52–14 | Huddersfield Giants | 9 September 2017, 13:30 | AJ Bell Stadium | James Child | 1,405 |

=== Round 6 ===
| Home | Score | Away | Match Information |
| Home | Score | Away | Date and Time | Venue | Referee | Attendance |
|---|---|---|---|---|---|---|
| Hull | 19–18 | Wakefield Trinity | 14 September 2017, 20:00 | KCOM Stadium | Phil Bentham | 10,921 |
| Leeds Rhinos | 44–2 | Salford Red Devils | 15 September 2017, 20:00 | Headingley Carnegie | Liam Moore | 13,094 |
| St. Helens | 40–16 | Huddersfield Giants | 15 September 2017, 20:00 | Totally Wicked Stadium | Gareth Hewer | 9,419 |
| Wigan Warriors | 20–38 | Castleford Tigers | 17 September 2017, 15:00 | DW Stadium | Ben Thaler | 15,706 |

=== Round 7 ===
| Home | Score | Away | Match Information |
| Home | Score | Away | Date and Time | Venue | Referee | Attendance |
|---|---|---|---|---|---|---|
| Salford Red Devils | 4–30 | St Helens | 21 September 2017, 20:00 | AJ Bell Stadium | James Child | 2,840 |
| Castleford Tigers | 16–48 | Hull | 22 September 2017, 20:00 | Mend-A-Hose Jungle | Ben Thaler | 8,894 |
| Huddersfield Giants | 12–36 | Leeds Rhinos | 22 September 2017, 20:00 | John Smith's Stadium | Scott Mikalauskas | 6,247 |
| Wakefield Trinity | 32–0 | Wigan Warriors | 23 September 2017, 15:15 | Beaumont Legal Stadium | Robert Hicks | 5,155 |
