= 2020 Super League season results =

2020 British rugby league results

The 2020 Super League XXV season is the 25th season of Super League, and 126th season of rugby league in Great Britain. It began on 30 January 2020, and was originally scheduled to end on 10 October 2020. It was to have consisted of 29 regular season games, and four rounds of play-offs, including the Grand Final at Old Trafford. Due to the ongoing effects of the Covid-19 pandemic, there is uncertainty surrounding the remaining fixtures, and the league table will be decided on a percentage basis for the first time since 1930 (excluding the War Emergency Leagues). The fixture list was released on 5 November 2019.

On 20 July 2020 Toronto Wolfpack withdrew from the competition and Super League expunged the teams’ completed results from the season's results.

On 3 November 2020, Hull KR announced that they were unable to fulfil the remainder of their fixtures, due to a COVID-19 outbreak within the club, and had no alternative but to terminate the remainder of their season. It was also reported, that three players had returned positive tests, with another two inconclusive, five having to self isolate and nine players injured.

== Fixtures and results ==
=== Round 1 ===
Home	Score	Away	Match information
Home	Score	Away	Date and time (GMT)	Venue	Referee	Attendance
Wigan Warriors	16–10	Warrington Wolves	30 January 2020, 19:45	DW Stadium	Chris Kendall	15,040
Hull KR	30–12	Wakefield Trinity	31 January 2020, 19:45	Hull College Craven Park Stadium	Robert Hicks	8,492
St. Helens	48–8	Salford Red Devils	31 January 2020, 19:45	Totally Wicked Stadium	Liam Moore	12,008
Catalans Dragons	12–32	Huddersfield Giants	1 February 2020, 17:00	Stade Gilbert Brutus	Scott Mikalauskus	8,254
Leeds Rhinos	4–30	Hull F.C.	2 February 2020, 16:45	Headingley	Ben Thaler	19,500

=== Round 2 ===
Home	Score	Away	Match information
Home	Score	Away	Date and time (GMT)	Venue	Referee	Attendance
Warrington Wolves	19–0	St. Helens	6 February 2020, 19:45	Halliwell Jones Stadium	Chris Kendall	12,562
Castleford Tigers	16–12	Wigan Warriors	7 February 2020, 19:45	Mend-A-Hose Jungle	Marcus Griffiths	8,848
Hull F.C.	25–16	Hull KR	7 February 2020, 20:00	KCOM Stadium	Robert Hicks	19,599
Huddersfield Giants	26–27 (Note: After golden-point extra time)	Leeds Rhinos	2 August 2020, 18:30 (Note: Match postponed on original date due to poor weather conditions caused by Storm Ciara)	Headingley	Robert Hicks	—
Wakefield Trinity	C–C (Note: Match cancelled after Super League meeting on 3 November rescheduled the play-offs and ended the regular season early.)	Catalans Dragons	—	—	—	—

=== Round 3 ===
Home	Score	Away	Match information
Home	Score	Away	Date and time (GMT)	Venue	Referee	Attendance
Leeds Rhinos	52–10	Hull KR	14 February 2020, 19:45	Headingley	Tom Grant	11,057
Salford Red Devils	10–12	Huddersfield Giants	14 February 2020, 19:45	AJ Bell Stadium	James Child	3,350
Catalans Dragons	36–18	Castleford Tigers	15 February 2020, 17:00	Stade Gilbert Brutus	Gareth Hewer	8,886
Hull F.C.	18–32	St. Helens	16 February 2020, 15:00	KCOM Stadium	Liam Moore	12,399
Wakefield Trinity	18–8	Warrington Wolves	16 February 2020, 15:00	The Mobile Rocket Stadium	Marcus Griffiths	5,197

=== Round 4 ===
Home	Score	Away	Match information
Home	Score	Away	Date and time (GMT)	Venue	Referee	Attendance
Castleford Tigers	32–15	Wakefield Trinity	21 February 2020, 19:45	Mend-A-Hose Jungle	James Child	7,202
Hull KR	4–22	Huddersfield Giants	21 February 2020, 19:45	Hull College Craven Park Stadium	Liam Moore	7,350
Salford Red Devils	8–22	Leeds Rhinos	22 February 2020, 14:00	AJ Bell Stadium	Marcus Griffiths	4,757
Wigan Warriors	26–12	Hull F.C.	23 February 2020, 15:00	DW Stadium	Robert Hicks	12,005
St. Helens	34–6 (Note: Match postponed on original date, Due to St Helens' involvement in the WCC)	Catalans Dragons	2 August 2020, 16:15	Headingley	Ben Thaler	—

=== Round 5 ===
Home	Score	Away	Match information
Home	Score	Away	Date and time (GMT)	Venue	Referee	Attendance
Hull KR	8–28	Castleford Tigers	27 February 2020, 19:45	Hull College Craven Park Stadium	Chris Kendall	7,464
Leeds Rhinos	36–0	Warrington Wolves	28 February 2020, 19:45	Headingley	Robert Hicks	12,124
Huddersfield Giants	10–42	Wigan Warriors	1 March 2020, 15:00	John Smith's Stadium	James Child	6,574
Hull F.C.	29–34	Catalans Dragons	1 March 2020, 15:00	KCOM Stadium	Gareth Hewer	12,003
Salford Red Devils	12–22	Wakefield Trinity	1 March 2020, 15:00	AJ Bell Stadium	Liam Moore	3,801

=== Round 6 ===
Home	Score	Away	Match information
Home	Score	Away	Date and time (GMT)	Venue	Referee	Attendance
St. Helens	10–12	Huddersfield Giants	6 March 2020, 19:45	Totally Wicked Stadium	Gareth Hewer	10,418
Wakefield Trinity	26–27 (Note: After golden-point extra time)	Hull F.C.	6 March 2020, 19:45	The Mobile Rocket Stadium	James Child	5,528
Warrington Wolves	9–8	Castleford Tigers	6 March 2020, 19:45	Halliwell Jones Stadium	Robert Hicks	9,228
Catalans Dragons	30–14	Salford Red Devils	7 March 2020, 17:00	Stade Gilbert Brutus	Chris Kendall	7,904
Wigan Warriors	30–16	Hull KR	8 March 2020, 15:00	DW Stadium	Tom Grant	11,511

=== Round 7 ===
Home	Score	Away	Match information
Home	Score	Away	Date and time (GMT)	Venue	Referee	Attendance
Hull F.C.	4–38	Warrington Wolves	12 March 2020, 19:45	KCOM Stadium	Chris Kendall	10,214
Salford Red Devils	18–14	Wigan Warriors	13 March 2020, 19:45	AJ Bell Stadium	James Child	4,796
Castleford Tigers	28–14	St. Helens	15 March 2020, 15:30	Mend-A-Hose Jungle	Liam Moore	7,268
Wakefield Trinity	6–29	Huddersfield Giants	17 September 2020, 15:00 (Note: Match postponed on original date due to both teams' involvement in the Challenge Cup)	John Smiths Stadium (Note: all games will resume behind closed doors, at neutral venues due to the COVID-19 pandemic in the United Kingdom)	Jack Smith	—
Catalans Dragons	C–C	Leeds Rhinos	— (Note: Game postponed on 13 March, as Leeds decided that they would not travel to Perpignan as one of the Leeds players had shown signs of COVID-19 symptoms. The fixture was then rescheduled for 7 September 2020 but was again postponed on 27 August, due to three Catalans players having tested positive for COVID-19.)	—	—	—

=== Round 8 ===
Home	Score	Away	Match information
Home	Score	Away	Date and time (BST)	Venue	Referee
Castleford Tigers	14–40	Catalans Dragons	8 August 2020, 16:15	Emerald Headingley	Robert Hicks
Warrington Wolves	40–10	Hull KR	8 August 2020, 18:30	Emerald Headingley	James Child
Salford Red Devils	54–18	Hull FC	9 August 2020, 13:00	Emerald Headingley	Liam Moore
Wakefield Trinity	22–23	Wigan Warriors	9 August 2020, 15:15	Emerald Headingley	Ben Thaler
Leeds Rhinos	0–48	St Helens	9 August 2020, 18:30	Emerald Headingley	Chris Kendall

=== Round 9 ===
Home	Score	Away	Match information
Home	Score	Away	Date and time (BST)	Venue	Referee
Wakefield Trinity	0–58	Catalans Dragons (Note: As a result of at least six Hull F.C. players testing positive for COVID-19, round 9 matches involving Hull F.C. and their opponents, Salford Red Devils, were postponed, and the fixture list was reversed for this round, with Castleford now set to play St Helens, whilst Wakefield will now play Catalans.)	15 August 2020, 16:15	Totally Wicked Stadium	Chris Kendall
Huddersfield Giants	18–19	Warrington Wolves	15 August 2020, 18:30	Totally Wicked Stadium	Ben Thaler
St Helens	10–0	Castleford Tigers	16 August 2020, 16:15	Totally Wicked Stadium	James Child
Wigan Warriors	28–10	Leeds Rhinos	16 August 2020, 18:30	Totally Wicked Stadium	Robert Hicks
Hull FC	48–6	Castleford Tigers	18 October 2020, 15:00	KCOM Stadium	Marcus Griffiths
Salford Red Devils	42–24	Catalans Dragons	2 November 2020, 15:00	AJ Bell Stadium	Jack Smith

=== Round 10 ===
Home	Score	Away	Match information
Home	Score	Away	Date and time (BST)	Venue	Referee
Leeds Rhinos	50–12	Salford Red Devils	29 August 2020, 18:30	Halliwell Jones Stadium	Liam Moore
Hull KR	18–32	St Helens	30 August 2020, 13:00	Halliwell Jones Stadium	Scott Mikalauskas
Huddersfield Giants	12–31	Hull FC	30 August 2020, 16:15	Halliwell Jones Stadium	Chris Kendall
Warrington Wolves	36–0	Wakefield Trinity	30 August 2020, 18:30	Halliwell Jones Stadium	Marcus Griffiths
Wigan Warriors	C–C (Note: Match scheduled for 15 October but postponed on 14 October due to a number of Wigan players testing positive for COVID-19)	Catalans Dragons	—	—	—

- All fixtures are subject to change

=== Round 11 ===
Home	Score	Away	Match information
Home	Score	Away	Date and time (BST)	Venue	Referee
Hull KR	34–18	Wigan Warriors	3 September 2020, 18:00	Emerald Headingley	Tom Grant
Salford Red Devils	30–37	Castleford Tigers	3 September 2020, 20:15	Emerald Headingley	Robert Hicks
Huddersfield Giants	6–54	St Helens	4 September 2020, 18:00	Emerald Headingley	Liam Moore
Warrington Wolves	37–12	Hull FC	4 September 2020, 20:15	Emerald Headingley	Ben Thaler
Wakefield Trinity	18–20 (Note: match postponed on 2 September, due to two Wakefield players testing positive for Covid-19)	Leeds Rhinos	1 November 2020, 14:00	The Mobile Rocket Stadium	Marcus Griffiths

=== Round 12 ===
Home	Score	Away	Match information
Home	Score	Away	Date and time (BST)	Venue	Referee	Attendance
Hull FC	26–23	Wakefield Trinity	10 September 2020, 18:00	Totally Wicked Stadium	Marcus Griffiths	—
Castleford Tigers	10–12	Warrington Wolves	10 September 2020, 20:15	Totally Wicked Stadium	Robert Hicks	—
St Helens	21–20 (Note: After golden-point extra time)	Hull KR	11 September 2020, 18:00	Totally Wicked Stadium	Jack Smith	—
Leeds Rhinos	13–12	Huddersfield Giants	11 September 2020, 20:15	Totally Wicked Stadium	Scott Mikalauskus; James Child (Note: Mikalauskus was replaced by James Child after 20 mins, due to Mikalauskus losing his voice.)	—
Catalans Dragons	12–28	Wigan Warriors	12 September 2020, 17:00	Stade Gilbert Brutus	Chris Kendall	5,000 (Note: French Covid restrictions allow spectators to attend Catalans home games with the total crowd limited to 5,000.)

=== Round 13 ===
Home	Score	Away	Match information
Home	Score	Away	Date and time (BST)	Venue	Referee
Hull KR	16–41	Leeds Rhinos	24 September 2020, 14:45	Halliwell Jones Stadium	Jack Smith
Hull FC	22–28	Salford Red Devils	24 September 2020, 18:00	Halliwell Jones Stadium	Chris Kendall
Castleford Tigers	19–31	Huddersfield Giants	24 September 2020, 20:15	Halliwell Jones Stadium	Liam Moore
Warrington Wolves	30–16	Catalans Dragons	25 September 2020, 18:00	Halliwell Jones Stadium	Robert Hicks
Wigan Warriors	28–16	Wakefield Trinity	25 September 2020, 20:15	Halliwell Jones Stadium	James Child

=== Round 14 ===
Home	Score	Away	Match information
Home	Score	Away	Date and time (BST)	Venue	Referee
Salford Red Devils	20–18	Warrington Wolves	29 September 2020, 17:30	AJ Bell Stadium	Scott Mikalauskus
Wigan Warriors	0–42	St Helens	29 September 2020, 19:45	AJ Bell Stadium	Ben Thaler
Leeds Rhinos	6–34	Catalans Dragons	30 September 2020, 18:00	Emerald Headingley (Note: this game will now be played behind closed doors, without any spectators in attendance)	Robert Hicks
Huddersfield Giants	32–22	Hull KR	30 September 2020, 19:00	John Smiths Stadium	Marcus Griffiths
Castleford Tigers	28–32	Hull FC	1 October 2020, 19:45	Mend-A-Hose Jungle	Tom Grant

=== Round 15 ===
Home	Score	Away	Match information
Home	Score	Away	Date and time (BST)	Venue	Referee	Attendance
Catalans Dragons	40–8	Wakefield Trinity	4 October 2020, 18:00 (Note: Fixture originally set for 14 October, but brought forward due to a fixture reshuffle)	Stade Gilbert Brutus	James Child	5,000
Huddersfield Giants	16–24	Salford Red Devils	8 October 2020, 17:30	Emerald Headingley	Robert Hicks	—
Wakefield Trinity	16–20	St Helens	9 October 2020, 17:30	Emerald Headingley	Liam Moore	—
Warrington Wolves	14–18	Wigan Warriors	9 October 2020, 19:45	Emerald Headingley	Chris Kendall	—

=== Round 16 ===
Home	Score	Away	Match information
Home	Score	Away	Date and time (BST)	Venue	Referee	Attendance
Catalans Dragons	34–4	Hull KR	9 October 2020, 18:00	Stade Gilbert Brutus	Jack Smith	5,000
Hull KR	24–22	Salford Red Devils	13 October 2020, 14:00	Halliwell Jones Stadium	James Child	—
Hull FC	18–16	Huddersfield Giants	13 October 2020, 17:30	Halliwell Jones Stadium	Scott Mikalauskus	—
Warrington Wolves	32–6	Leeds Rhinos	13 October 2020, 19:45	Halliwell Jones Stadium	Chris Kendall	—
St Helens	48–6	Wakefield Trinity	15 October 2020, 19:45	Halliwell Jones Stadium	Robert Hicks	—

=== Round 17 (Black History Round) ===
Home	Score	Away	Match information
Home	Score	Away	Date and time (BST)	Venue	Referee	Attendance
Catalans Dragons	C–C (Note: Match postponed on 21 October after five Catalans players and two members of the coaching staff tested positive for Covid-19.)	Hull FC	—	—	—	—
Castleford Tigers	38–24	Hull KR	22 October 2020, 17:30	Totally Wicked Stadium	Gareth Hewer	—
Huddersfield Giants	14–18	Wakefield Trinity	22 October 2020, 19:45	Totally Wicked Stadium	Marcus Griffiths	—
Wigan Warriors	58–12	Salford Red Devils	23 October 2020, 17:30	Totally Wicked Stadium	Chris Kendall	—
St Helens	40–8	Leeds Rhinos	23 October 2020, 19:45	Totally Wicked Stadium	Liam Moore	—

=== Round 18 ===
Home	Score	Away	Match information
Home	Score	Away	Date and time (BST)	Venue	Referee	Attendance
Wigan Warriors	30–22	Castleford Tigers (Note: Wigan were scheduled to play Catalans. Three Catalans players and a staff member tested positive for Covid meaning this fixture was postponed, and Wigan will now play Castleford)	29 August 2020, 16:15	Halliwell Jones Stadium	James Child	—
Hull F.C.	22–40	Leeds Rhinos (Note: Leeds were originally due to play Castleford, but Castleford were stood down on 7 October after three players tested positive for Covid-19 and six more ordered to isolate. This left Castleford with just 14 fit players to form a team, so now they will play Hull in Round 18 instead.)	8 October 2020, 19:45	Emerald Headingley	Ben Thaler	—
Wakefield Trinity	48–18	Hull KR	25 October 2020, 14:00	The Mobile Rocket Stadium	Scott Mikalauskas	—
Salford Red Devils	12–10	St Helens	26 October 2020, 17:30	Emerald Headingley	Ben Thaler	—
Leeds Rhinos	28–24	Castleford Tigers	26 October 2020, 19:45	Emerald Headingley	Tom Grant	—
Catalans Dragons	C–C (Note: Match postponed on 24 October, due to two more positive COVID-19 tests among the Catalans squad, forcing the club to be once again, shut down until further tests are carried out.)	Warrington Wolves	—	—	—	—

=== Round 19 ===
Home	Score	Away	Match information
Home	Score	Away	Date and time (BST)	Venue	Referee
Leeds Rhinos	6–30	Wakefield Trinity	29 October 2020, 17:30	Totally Wicked Stadium	Ben Thaler
Hull KR	16–31	Hull FC	29 October 2020, 19:45	Totally Wicked Stadium	Liam Moore
Warrington Wolves	19–12	Huddersfield Giants	30 October 2020, 18:00 (Note: Match originally set for Round 21, but brought forward as both clubs originally scheduled round 19 matches were postponed.)	Totally Wicked Stadium	Robert Hicks
St Helens	6–18	Wigan Warriors	30 October 2020, 20:15	Totally Wicked Stadium	Chris Kendall
Huddersfield Giants	C–C (Note: Game postponed on 28 October due to 12 positive COVID-19 cases amongst the Castleford squad.)	Castleford Tigers	—	—	—
Warrington Wolves	24–0 (Note: Salford forfeited the game due to player unavailability. Under RFL operational rules Warrington were awarded an automatic 24–0 win. With Huddersfield also being without a game in round 19, Warrington and Huddersfield will meet on 30 October in a rearranged round 21 fixture.)	Salford Red Devils	—	—	—

=== Round 20 ===
Home	Score	Away	Match information
Home	Score	Away	Date and time (BST)	Venue	Referee	Attendance
Hull KR	C–C (Note: Due to numerous COVID-19 cases within the Hull KR playing bubble, the club announced on 2 November that they would not be able to fulfil any of their remaining fixtures and have terminated their season early.)	Warrington Wolves	—	—	—	—
Castleford Tigers	C–C (Note: Game postponed on 2 November due to four more positive COVID-19 cases amongst the Castleford squad. Following the decision on 3 November to resechedule and reformat the play-offs, this fixture will not be played.)	Leeds Rhinos	—	—	—	—
Catalans Dragons	C–C	St Helens	—	—	—	—
Wakefield Trinity	20–28	Salford Red Devils	6 November 2020, 17:30	Emerald Headingley	Liam Moore	—
Wigan Warriors	19–6	Huddersfield Giants	6 November 2020, 19:45	Emerald Headingley	Chris Kendall	—
