= 2018 New Zealand rugby league tour of England =

New Zealand national rugby league team tour

2018 Kiwi tour
- Date: 27 October 2018 – 11 November 2018
Summary
P	W	D	L
Total
3	1	0	2
Test match
3	1	0	2
Opponent
P	W	D	L
England
3	1	0	2

Tour chronology
- Previous tour: 2015

The 2018 New Zealand rugby league tour of England was a tour by the New Zealand national rugby league team. The New Zealand national rugby league team played a three match test series against England for the Baskerville Shield, losing 2-1.

== Background ==
RLIF World Rankings
Official Rankings as of July 2018
Rank	Change*	Team	Pts%
2	Steady	New Zealand	72.7
3	Steady	England	70.4

New Zealand and England previously played against each other in a mid-season international on 23 June 2018 at Mile High Stadium in Denver, Colorado. England won 36-18.

New Zealand was last in England for the 2016 Rugby League Four Nations. During that tournament New Zealand defeated England 17-16 in Huddersfield. They last played a three match test series against England during the 2015 New Zealand rugby league tour of Great Britain, losing the series 2-1. With the completion of these three tests, New Zealand and England played each other four times in 2018.

== Squads ==
=== New Zealand ===
A wider squad was named on 3 September 2018 consisting of the best New Zealand eligible players in the running to play in the upcoming tour. The final touring squad of 23 players was named on 1 October.

On 4 October, Corey Harawira-Naera withdrew from the touring 23-man squad due to a groin injury. Agnatius Paasi and Peta Hiku were subsequently added to the squad.

Ages are as of 27 October 2018, the day of the first test.

Pos.	Player	Date of birth (age)	Games	Points	Club
Prop	Leeson Ah Mau	20 December 1989 (aged 28)	3	0	St. George Illawarra Dragons
Centre	Gerard Beale	18 July 1990 (aged 28)	0	0	New Zealand Warriors
Prop, Lock	Adam Blair	20 March 1986 (aged 32)	2	0	New Zealand Warriors
Prop	Jesse Bromwich	3 May 1989 (aged 29)	3	4	Melbourne Storm
Second-row, Lock	Kenny Bromwich	22 September 1991 (aged 27)	3	0	Melbourne Storm
Lock, Second-row	James Fisher-Harris	5 January 1996 (aged 22)	2	0	Penrith Panthers
Centre	Peta Hiku	4 December 1992 (aged 25)	0	0	New Zealand Warriors
Fullback, Five-eighth	Jahrome Hughes	8 October 1994 (aged 24)	0	0	Melbourne Storm
Wing	Jamayne Isaako	5 June 1996 (aged 22)	1	0	Brisbane Broncos
Halfback, Five-eighth	Shaun Johnson	9 September 1990 (aged 28)	3	22	New Zealand Warriors
Lock, Second-row	Isaac Liu	26 April 1991 (aged 27)	3	4	Sydney Roosters
Centre	Joseph Manu	29 June 1996 (aged 22)	3	0	Sydney Roosters
Centre	Esan Marsters	17 August 1996 (aged 22)	3	4	Wests Tigers
Wing	Ken Maumalo	16 July 1994 (aged 24)	3	12	New Zealand Warriors
Halfback	Kodi Nikorima	3 April 1994 (aged 24)	3	4	Brisbane Broncos
Prop	Agnatius Paasi	30 November 1991 (aged 26)	0	0	New Zealand Warriors
Second-row	Isaiah Papali'i	20 September 1998 (aged 20)	1	2	New Zealand Warriors
Second-row	Kevin Proctor	28 February 1989 (aged 29)	3	0	Gold Coast Titans
Wing	Jordan Rapana	15 August 1989 (aged 29)	2	0	Canberra Raiders
Hooker, Lock	Brandon Smith	31 May 1996 (aged 22)	3	0	Melbourne Storm
Second-row	Joseph Tapine	4 May 1994 (aged 24)	2	4	Canberra Raiders
Prop, Lock	Martin Taupau	3 February 1990 (aged 28)	2	0	Manly Warringah Sea Eagles
Prop	Jared Waerea-Hargreaves	20 January 1989 (aged 29)	3	0	Sydney Roosters
Fullback, Wing	Dallin Watene-Zelezniak (captain)	17 August 1995 (aged 23)	3	8	Penrith Panthers

== Pre-tour matches ==
13 October 2018	New Zealand	26 – 24	Australia	Mount Smart Stadium, Auckland

17 October 2018	England	44 – 6	France	Leigh Sports Village, Leigh

== Baskerville Shield ==
=== Venues ===
Hull	Liverpool	Leeds
KCOM Stadium	Anfield	Elland Road
Capacity: 25,400	Capacity: 54,074	Capacity: 37,792

=== First test ===
27 October 2018
14:30 BST (UTC+01)

England	18–16	New Zealand
Tries: Connor, Gildart, Tomkins; Goals: Connor (3/4)	Report	Tries: Marsters, Watene-Zelezniak; Goals: Johnson (4/4)

KCOM Stadium, Kingston-upon-Hull
Attendance: 17,649
Referee: Robert Hicks (England)

Team details

FB	1	Jonny Lomax
WG	2	Tommy Makinson
CE	3	Jake Connor
CE	4	Oliver Gildart
WG	5	Jermaine McGillvary
FE	6	George Williams
HB	7	Sam Tomkins
PR	15	Tom Burgess
HK	9	Josh Hodgson
PR	10	James Graham
SR	11	John Bateman
SR	12	Elliott Whitehead
LK	13	Sean O'Loughlin (c)
Interchange:
BE	8	Chris Hill
BE	14	Luke Thompson
BE	16	George Burgess
BE	17	Daryl Clark
Coach:
Wayne Bennett

FB	1	Dallin Watene-Zelezniak (c)
WG	2	Ken Maumalo
CE	3	Esan Marsters
CE	4	Joseph Manu
WG	5	Jordan Rapana
FE	6	Shaun Johnson
HB	7	Kodi Nikorima
PR	8	Jesse Bromwich
HK	9	Brandon Smith
PR	10	Jared Waerea-Hargreaves
SR	11	Kevin Proctor
SR	12	Isaac Liu
LK	13	James Fisher-Harris
Interchange:
BE	14	Kenny Bromwich
BE	15	Leeson Ah Mau
BE	16	Martin Taupau
BE	19	Joseph Tapine
Coach:
Michael Maguire

Man of the Match:
Elliott Whitehead (England)

Touch judges:
Chris Kendall (England)
Richard Thompson (England)
Video referee:
Ben Thaler (England)

Notes:

- Oliver Gildart (England) made his Test debut.

=== Second test ===
4 November 2018
14:30 GMT (UTC+00)

England	20–14	New Zealand
Tries: Makinson (3), Connor; Goals: Tomkins (1/1), Connor (1/4)	Report	Tries: Maumalo, Watene-Zelezniak; Goals: Johnson (3/3)

Anfield, Liverpool
Attendance: 26,234
Referee: Gerard Sutton (Australia)

Team details

FB	1	Jonny Lomax
WG	2	Tommy Makinson
CE	3	Jake Connor
CE	4	Oliver Gildart
WG	5	Jermaine McGillvary
FE	6	George Williams
HB	7	Sam Tomkins
PR	15	Tom Burgess
HK	9	Josh Hodgson
PR	10	James Graham (c)
SR	11	John Bateman
SR	12	Elliott Whitehead
LK	13	Luke Thompson
Interchange:
BE	8	Chris Hill
BE	14	Adam Milner
BE	16	George Burgess
BE	17	Daryl Clark
Coach:
Wayne Bennett

FB	1	Dallin Watene-Zelezniak (c)
WG	2	Ken Maumalo
CE	3	Esan Marsters
CE	4	Joseph Manu
WG	5	Jordan Rapana
FE	6	Shaun Johnson
HB	7	Kodi Nikorima
PR	8	Jesse Bromwich
HK	9	Brandon Smith
PR	10	Jared Waerea-Hargreaves
SR	11	Kevin Proctor
SR	12	Isaac Liu
LK	13	Adam Blair
Interchange:
BE	14	Kenny Bromwich
BE	15	Leeson Ah Mau
BE	16	Martin Taupau
BE	17	James Fisher-Harris
Coach:
Michael Maguire

Man of the Match:
Tommy Makinson (England)

Touch judges:
James Child (England)
Liam Moore (England)
Video referee:
Ben Thaler (England)

=== Third test ===
11 November 2018
15:15 GMT (UTC+00)

England	0–34	New Zealand
	Report	Tries: Maumalo (2), J. Bromwich, Liu, Nikorima, Tapine; Goals: Johnson (4/5), Papali'i (1/1)

Elland Road, Leeds
Attendance: 32,186
Referee: Gerard Sutton (Australia)

Team details

FB	1	Jonny Lomax
WG	2	Tommy Makinson
CE	3	Jake Connor
CE	4	Oliver Gildart
WG	5	Jermaine McGillvary
FE	6	George Williams
HB	7	Richie Myler
PR	15	Tom Burgess
HK	9	Josh Hodgson
PR	10	James Graham (c)
SR	11	John Bateman
SR	12	Elliott Whitehead
LK	13	Luke Thompson
Interchange:
BE	8	Chris Hill
BE	14	Adam Milner
BE	16	Joe Greenwood
BE	17	Stefan Ratchford
Coach:
Wayne Bennett

FB	1	Dallin Watene-Zelezniak (c)
WG	2	Ken Maumalo
CE	3	Esan Marsters
CE	4	Joseph Manu
WG	5	Jamayne Isaako
FE	6	Shaun Johnson
HB	7	Kodi Nikorima
PR	8	Jesse Bromwich
HK	9	Brandon Smith
PR	10	Jared Waerea-Hargreaves
SR	11	Kevin Proctor
SR	12	Isaac Liu
LK	13	Adam Blair
Interchange:
BE	14	Kenny Bromwich
BE	15	Leeson Ah Mau
BE	16	Isaiah Papali'i
BE	17	Joseph Tapine
Coach:
Michael Maguire

Man of the Match:
Kodi Nikorima (New Zealand)

Touch judges:
James Child (England)
Liam Moore (England)
Video referee:
Phil Bentham (England)

Notes:

- Joe Greenwood (England) made his Test debut, while Isaiah Papali'i made his debut for New Zealand having previously represented Samoa.
