= 2017 Challenge Cup =

Rugby league competition

2017 Ladbrokes Challenge Cup
- Duration: 9 Rounds
- Number of teams: 72
- Highest attendance: 68,525 ( Hull F.C. vs Wigan Warriors) (Final)
- Lowest attendance: 87 (Note: Lowest recorded attendance. Attendances from rounds 1 and 2 which featured amateur teams only were not recorded) ( Gloucestershire All Golds vs North Wales Crusaders) (3rd round)
- Aggregate attendance: 184,212
- Broadcast partners: BBC Sport; Sky Sports
- Winners: Hull
- Runners-up: Wigan Warriors
- Biggest home win: London Chargers 116 – 0 Bridgend Blue Bulls (1st Round)
- Biggest away win: Aberdeen Warriors 8 – 62 Pilkington Recs (1st Round)
- Lance Todd Trophy: Marc Sneyd
- Top point-scorer(s): 46 Liam Sutcliffe Leeds Rhinos
- Top try-scorer(s): 6 Kieran Cross Doncaster

The 2017 Challenge Cup, (also known as the Ladbrokes Challenge Cup for sponsorship reasons) was the 116th staging of the Challenge Cup the main rugby league knockout tournament for teams in the Super League, the British National Leagues and a number of invited amateur clubs.

The defending champions were Hull F.C. who beat Warrington Wolves 12–10 in the 2016 final at Wembley Stadium. Hull F.C. retained the trophy beating Wigan Warriors 18–14 at Wembley on 26 August 2017.

The format of the competition was eight knock-out rounds followed by a final. The first two rounds were composed entirely of 32 amateur teams. The eight winners of the second round ties were joined in round 3 by the 16 League 1 teams including for the first time a Canadian team, the Toronto Wolfpack. For the fourth round the 12 Championship teams were included in the draw. Round 5 saw four Super League teams entering the competition. These are the four teams that finished in the top four positions of the 2016 Qualifiers and are Huddersfield Giants, Leeds Rhinos, Leigh Centurions and Salford Red Devils. The remaining eight Super League teams joined in round 6.

== Round dates ==
Round	Dates
Round 1	28–29 January 2017
Round 2	11–12 February 2017
Round 3	25–26 February 2017
Round 4	17–19+26 March 2017
Round 5	21–23 April 2017
Round 6	11–14 May 2017
Quarter-finals	15–18 June 2017
Semi-finals	29–30 July 2017
Final	26 August 2017

== First round ==
The draw for the first round of the 2017 Challenge Cup was held on 5 January 2017 at the Deep to celebrate the city being named 2017 UK City of Culture and Hull's efforts in 2016 and featured 32 amateur teams from around the United Kingdom including one student team, all three armed services and the police. Home teams were drawn by Lee Radford and the away teams drawn by Dean Andrew, President of the RFL and The RAF.

Fixtures for the first round were played over the weekend of the 28–29 January 2017.

Home	Score	Away	Match Information
Home	Score	Away	Date and Time	Venue	Referee	Attendance
London Chargers	116–0	Bridgend Blue Bulls	28 January 2017, 13:00	New River Stadium	S. Ellis
Leigh Miners Rangers	12–16	Wigan St Patricks	28 January 2017, 13:00	Leigh Miners Welfare Sports & Social Club	S. Mikalauskas
Thatto Heath Crusaders	30–10	Skirlaugh	28 January 2017, 13:30	Hattons Solicitors Crusader Park	H. Neville
Aberdeen Warriors	8–62	Pilkington Recs	28 January 2017, 13:30	Woodside Sports Complex	B. Milligan
University of Hull	12–22	Rochdale Mayfield	28 January 2017, 14:00	Hull University Sports & Fitness Centre	J. Stearne
West Bowling	0–12	Kells ARLFC	28 January 2017, 14:00	Emsley Recreation Ground	J. Barr
RAF	12–30	York Acorn	28 January 2017, 14:00	RAF College Cranwell	J. Jones
Fryston Warriors	33–10	Normanton Knights	28 January 2017, 14:00	Fryston Welfare Club	L. Staveley
Royal Navy	34–38	Myton Warriors	28 January 2017, 14:00	US Sports Ground	S. Houghton
Siddal ARLFC	16–4	Milford Marlins	28 January 2017, 14:00	Siddal Sports & Community Centre	C. Worsley
Egremont Rangers	24–14	British Army	28 January 2017, 14:00	Gilfoot Park	C. Astbury
West Hull	24–10	Hull Dockers	28 January 2017, 14:00	West Hull Community Park	N. Woodward
Thornhill Trojans	32–18	Lock Lane	28 January 2017, 14:00	Thornhill Sports & Community Centre	S. Chromiak
Featherstone Lions	29–28	Distington ARLFC	28 January 2017, 14:30	The Mill Pond Stadium	K. Moore
Wath Brow Hornets	4–17	Haydock ARLFC	28 January 2017, 14:30	Cleator Sports & Social Club	J. Turner
Wests Warriors	40–22	Great Britain Police	28 January 2017, 17:00	New River Stadium	M. Griffiths

== Second round ==
The second round draw was made on 31 January from the home of amateur team Siddal, who qualified for the second round by defeating Milford Martins 16–14, and was streamed live on BBC Sport's website. The draw was made by former players, Johnny Lawless and Luke Robinson both of whom played for Siddal before turning professional. Ties were played over the weekend of 11–12 February 2017 with the exception of the game between West Hull and Thatto Heath which was postponed for a week due to a waterlogged pitch.

Home	Score	Away	Match Information
Home	Score	Away	Date and Time	Venue	Referee	Attendance
Myton Warriors	18–4	York Acorn	11 February 2017, 13:30	Marist Sporting Club	G. Dolan
Featherstone Lions	0–26	Wests Warriors	11 February 2017, 14:00	The Mill Pond Stadium	B. Robinson
Haydock ARLFC	30–20	Thornhill Trojans	11 February 2017, 14:00	King George Playing Fields	L. Staveley
Wigan St Patricks	18–28	Egremont Rangers	11 February 2017, 14:00	Clarington Park	N. Bennett
Kells	14–16 (Note: After extra time)	Rochdale Mayfield	11 February 2017, 14:00	The Pit Field	L. Moore
Pilkington Recs	10–34	Siddal ARLFC	11 February 2017, 14:15	Ruskin Drive	G. Hewer
London Chargers	12–40	Fryston Warriors	11 February 2017, 16:00	New River Stadium	M. Rossleigh
West Hull	18–16	Thatto Heath Crusaders	18 February 2017, 14:00	West Hull ARLFC	S. Race

== Third round ==
The draw for the third round as made on 14 February 2017. The draw was conducted by Super League players Stefan Ratchford and Ryan Brierley. Ties were played 25–26 February 2017.

Home	Score	Away	Match Information
Home	Score	Away	Date and Time	Venue	Referee	Attendance
Siddal ARLFC	6–14	Toronto Wolfpack	25 February 2017, 13:00	Siddal Sports & Community Centre	T. Grant	1,053
West Hull	16–18	Whitehaven	25 February 2017, 14:00	West Hull Community Park	P. Marklove	150
Wests Warriors	12–26	Haydock ARLFC	25 February 2017, 14:30	New River Stadium	M. Rossleigh	430
Fryston Warriors	32–50	Keighley Cougars	25 February 2017, 15:00	The Big Fellas Stadium	J. McMullen	739
Newcastle Thunder	18–16	Workington Town	25 February 2017, 17:00	Kingston Park	M. Mannifield	400
Barrow Raiders	60–6	Rochdale Mayfield	26 February 2017, 14:00	Craven Park	M. Griffiths	500
Gloucestershire All Golds	36–18	North Wales Crusaders	26 February 2017, 14:00	Prince of Wales Stadium	G. Dolan	87
Hemel Stags	12–22	London Skolars	26 February 2017, 14:30	Pennine Way Stadium	S. Race	112
Doncaster	34–6	Myton Warriors	26 February 2017, 15:00	Keepmoat Stadium	L. Moore	366
York City Knights	48–8	Egremont Rangers	26 February 2017, 15:00	Bootham Crescent	L. Staveley	635
South Wales Ironmen	4–18	Oxford Rugby League	26 February 2017, 15:00	The Wern	N. Bennett	115
Hunslet	34–0	Coventry Bears	26 February 2017, 15:00	South Leeds Stadium	S. Mikalauskas	249

== Fourth round ==
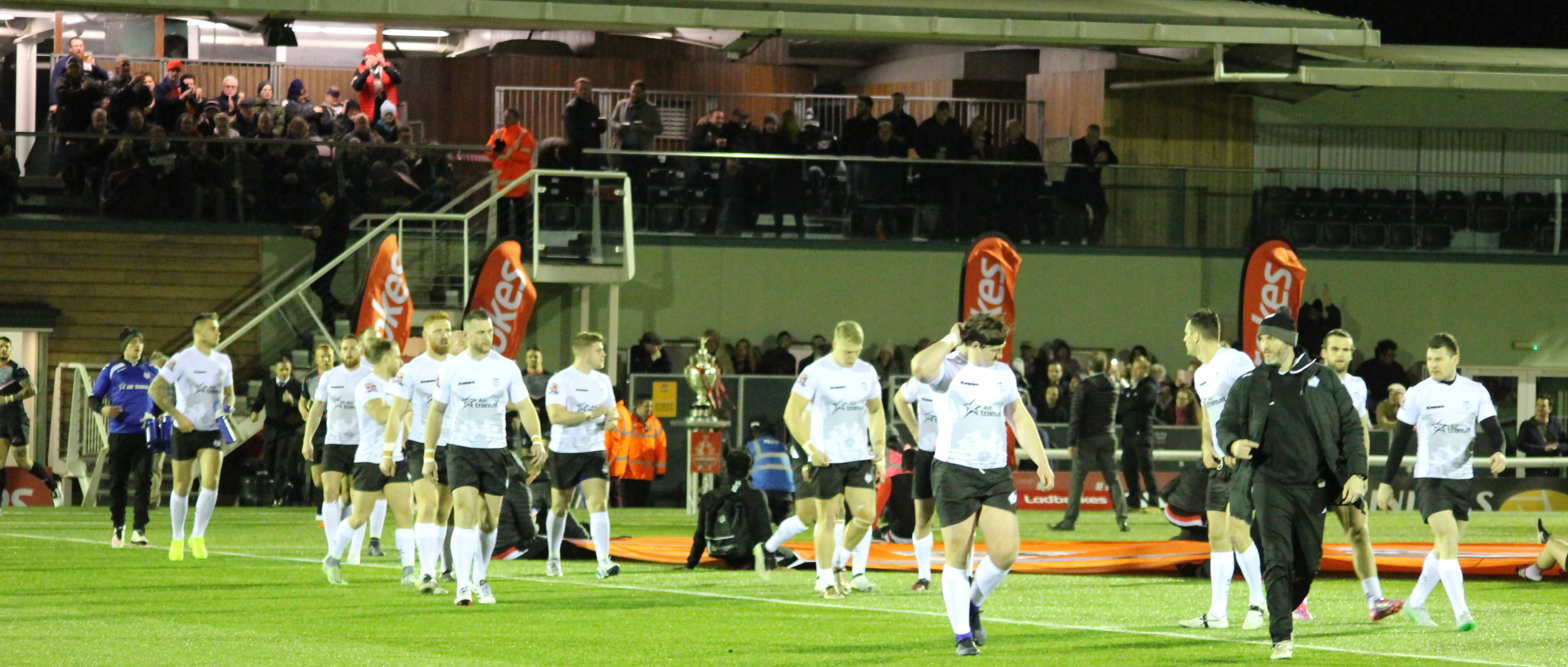
Toronto Wolfpack walking out at Trailfinders Sports Ground

The winners of the 12 third-round ties were joined in the fourth round by the 12 teams in the Championship. The draw was made on board HMS Bulwark on Tuesday 28 February. The draw was made by former St Helens player, Paul Sculthorpe and the chairman of the Royal Marine Rugby League Association, Major Jack Duckitt. Ties were played over the weekend of 17–19 March with the exception of the Whitehaven v Oxford fixture which was postponed due to a waterlogged pitch.

Home	Score	Away	Match Information
Home	Score	Away	Date and Time	Venue	Referee	Attendance
London Broncos	26–30	Toronto Wolfpack	17 March 2017, 20:00	Trailfinders Sports Ground	S. Mikalauskas	758
Dewsbury Rams	36–8	Newcastle Thunder	17 March 2017, 20:00	Tetley's Stadium	J. McMullen	425
Oldham	40–12	Haydock ARLFC	18 March 2017, 13:00	Bower Fold	N. Bennett	743
Toulouse Olympique	16–34	Batley Bulldogs	18 March 2017, 14:00	Stade Ernest-Argelès	J. Child	150
Swinton Lions	40 – 8	London Skolars	18 March 2017, 15:00	Heywood Road	G. Dolan	200
Barrow Raiders	20–0	Keighley Cougars	18 March 2017, 18:30	Craven Park, Barrow-in-Furness	G. Hewer	721
Bradford Bulls	13–21	Featherstone Rovers	19 March 2017, 15:00	Provident Stadium	C. Straw	2,458
Gloucestershire All Golds	22–48	Doncaster	19 March 2017, 15:00	Keepmoat Stadium (Note: Originally scheduled for Prince of Wales Stadium but due to the ground being unavailable for the All Golds, tie swapped to Doncaster)	M. Rossleigh	280
Halifax	20–6	Hunslet	19 March 2017, 15:00	The Shay	T. Grant	793
Hull Kingston Rovers	48–10	Sheffield Eagles	19 March 2017, 15:00	Craven Park	J. Roberts	3,408
York City Knights	26–20	Rochdale Hornets	19 March 2017, 15:00	Bootham Crescent	B. Robinson	652
Whitehaven	46–14	Oxford	26 March 2017, 14:00 (Note: Original match (19 March) postponed due to a waterlogged pitch)	Recreation Ground	T. Crashley	375

== Fifth round ==
The fifth round draw sees the entry of four Super League clubs, these being those that finished the top of the 2016 Qualifiers. The draw was made live on the BBC Radio 5 Live breakfast show on Tuesday 21 March at 7-45 am. The draw was made by show host, Rachel Burden, and former international player, at both codes, Jason Robinson.

Home	Score	Away	Match Information
Home	Score	Away	Date and Time	Venue	Referee	Attendance
Leeds Rhinos	64–28	Doncaster	21 April 2017, 20:00	Headingley Carnegie Stadium	C. Campbell	5,097
Leigh Centurions	10–23	Hull Kingston Rovers	22 April 2017, 15:00	Leigh Sports Village	J. Child	3,880
Salford Red Devils	29–22	Toronto Wolfpack	23 April 2017, 12:15	AJ Bell Stadium	J. Smith	1,318
Huddersfield Giants	24–28	Swinton Lions	23 April 2017, 12:30	John Smith's Stadium	S. Mikalauskas	1,292
Featherstone Rovers	30–4	Oldham	23 April 2017, 15:00	The Big Fellas Stadium	T. Grant	1,408
Dewsbury Rams	23–22	Batley Bulldogs	23 April 2017, 15:00	Tetley's Stadium	J. Roberts	962
Whitehaven	12–36	Halifax	23 April 2017, 15:00	Recreation Ground	L. Moore	636
York City Knights	28–50	Barrow Raiders	23 April 2017, 15:00	Bootham Crescent	J. McMullen	904

== Sixth round ==
The draw for the sixth round was made on Tuesday 25 April live on the BBC News channel during the 6-30pm Sportsday programme. The draw was made by former players Chris Joynt and Keith Senior.

Home	Score	Away	Match Information
Home	Score	Away	Date and Time	Venue	Referee	Attendance
Featherstone Rovers	24–12	Halifax	11 May 2017, 20:00	The Big Fellas Stadium	C. Campbell	1,736
Salford Red Devils	24–14	Hull Kingston Rovers	12 May 2017, 20:00	AJ Bell Stadium	R. Hicks	3,100
Dewsbury Rams	6–54	Wakefield Trinity	12 May 2017, 20:00	Tetley's Stadium	S. Mikalauskas	2,125
Hull	62–0	Catalans Dragons	12 May 2017, 20:00	KCOM Stadium	B. Thaler	6,470
Castleford Tigers	53–10	St. Helens	13 May 2017, 14:30	Mend-A-Hose Jungle	P. Bentham	5,216
Leeds Rhinos	72–10	Barrow Raiders	14 May 2017, 15:00	Headingley	J. Smith	5,226
Swinton Lions	12–42	Wigan Warriors	14 May 2017, 15:00	Heywood Road	C. Kendall	2,003
Warrington Wolves	34–20	Widnes Vikings	14 May 2017, 15:00	Halliwell Jones Stadium	J. Child	5,971

== Quarter-finals ==
The draw for the quarter finals was made immediately after the conclusion of the last sixth round match. Home teams were drawn by former Welsh international Iestyn Harris and away teams by Leigh captain Micky Higham.

Home	Score	Away	Match Information
Home	Score	Away	Date and Time	Venue	Referee	Attendance
Salford Red Devils	30–6	Wakefield Trinity	15 June, 20:00	AJ Bell Stadium	R. Hicks	2,820
Leeds Rhinos	58–0	Featherstone Rovers	16 June, 20:00	Headingley	C. Kendall	6,181
Warrington Wolves	26–27	Wigan Warriors	17 June, 15:00	Halliwell Jones Stadium	B. Thaler	7,312
Hull	32–24	Castleford Tigers	18 June, 15:00	KCOM Stadium	P. Bentham	11,944

== Semi-final ==
The semi-final draw was conducted on BBC 2 immediately after Hull's 32–24 victory over Castleford Tigers. Conducting the draw were two Challenge Cup winning team members; Danny Brough (2005) and Barry Johnson (1986). The ties were played at neutral venues; after the draw these were announced as Doncaster and Warrington.

Home	Score	Away	Match Information
Home	Score	Away	Date and Time	Venue	Referee	Attendance
Hull	43–24	Leeds Rhinos	29 July 2017, 14:30	Keepmoat Stadium	P. Bentham	14,526
Wigan Warriors	27–14	Salford Red Devils	30 July 2017, 14:30	Halliwell Jones Stadium	J. Child	10,796

== Final ==
Home	Score	Away	Match Information
Home	Score	Away	Date and Time	Venue	Referee	Attendance
Hull	18–14	Wigan Warriors	26 August 2017, 15:00	Wembley Stadium	Phil Bentham	68,525

Teams:

Hull: Jamie Shaul, Mahe Fonua, Josh Griffin, Carlos Tuimavave, Fetuli Talanoa, Albert Kelly, Marc Sneyd, Liam Watts, Danny Houghton, Scott Taylor, Sika Manu, Mark Minichiello, Gareth Ellis (captain).

Substitutes (all used): Chris Green, Danny Washbrook, Josh Bowden, Jake Connor.
Tries: Talanoa (1), Fonua (2). Goals: Sneyd (3/3).

Wigan Warriors: Sam Tomkins, Liam Marshall, Anthony Gelling, Oliver Gildart, Joe Burgess, George Williams, Thomas Leuluai, Frank Paul Nuuausala, Michael McIlorum, Tony Clubb, John Bateman, Liam Farrell, Sean O'Loughlin (captain).

Substitutes (all used): Willie Isa, Ryan Sutton, Sam Powell, Taulima Tautai.
Tries: Bateman (1), Gildart (1), Burgess (1). Goals: Williams (1/3).

Lance Todd Trophy Winner: Marc Sneyd

== Broadcasts ==
The primary broadcast organisation for the competition was BBC Sport. On 24 January the RFL announced that the BBC would be streaming one tie from each of the first five rounds live on the BBC Sport website with two games from the 6th, 7th and 8th rounds being broadcast live on BBC TV. The fifth-round game between Salford and Toronto was streamed live on Facebook (excluding the United Kingdom and Ireland) after the RFL and both clubs agreed a deal over global broadcast rights.

Sky Sports also have broadcasting rights after the fifth round and showed two games from the sixth round live.

=== Live matches ===
Round	Match	Date	Broadcast method
1st	Leigh Miners Rangers v Wigan St Patricks	28 January, 13:00	streamed BBC Sport
2nd	Pilkington Recs v Siddal	11 February, 14:15	streamed BBC Sport
3rd	Siddal v Toronto	25 February, 13:00	streamed BBC Sport
4th	Oldham v Haydock	18 March, 13:00	streamed BBC Sport
5th	Whitehaven v Halifax	23 April, 15:00	streamed BBC Sport
5th	Salford v Toronto	23 April, 12:15	streamed Facebook (not UK and Ireland)
6th	Featherstone v Halifax	11 May, 20:00	live Sky Sports
6th	Salford v Hull Kingston Rovers	12 May, 20:00	live Sky Sports
6th	Castleford v St. Helens	13 May, 14:30	live BBC One
6th	Warrington v Widnes	14 May, 15:00	live BBC Two
QF	Salford v Wakefield Trinity	15 June, 20:00	live Sky Sports
QF	Leeds v Featherstone Rovers	16 June, 20:00	live Sky Sports
QF	Warrington v Wigan	17 June, 15:00	live BBC One
QF	Hull F.C. v Castleford	18 June, 15:00	live BBC Two
SF	Hull F.C. v Leeds	29 July, 14:30	live BBC One
SF	Wigan v Salford	30 July, 14:30	live BBC Two
F	Hull F.C. v Wigan	26 August, 15:00	live BBC One
