= Phil Bentham =

English rugby league referee (born 1971)

Personal information
- Born: Leigh, Lancashire, England

Refereeing information
Years	Competition	Apps
2005–2018	Super League	350+
2005–2018	Challenge Cup	30+
2007–2017	Internationals	20+
- Source: As of 2018

Phil Bentham Head of Match Officials at the RFL and a former Premier League football VAR coach. Bentham was an English professional rugby league referee and video referee. He was one of the Rugby Football League's full-time match officials since the role's inception in 2007. Bentham was referee in seven major finals and video referee in nine major finals.

== Background ==
Bentham was born in Leigh, Lancashire, England.

== First games ==
Bentham refereed his first professional match between Sheffield Eagles and London Skolars on 22 February 2004. His first Super League match was Wakefield Trinity versus Hull F.C. on 11 September 2005. Prior to him being promoted to a full-time role in 2007, Bentham combined refereeing with employment as a Financial Consultant.

== Major finals ==
Bentham was referee for both the 2011 and 2014 Super League grand finals. He was also the video referee in the 2009, 2012, 2015, and 2017 Super League grand finals.

He was the touch judge in the 2005 Challenge Cup Final. He was the referee in the 2011, 2013, 2014. and 2017 Challenge Cup finals. Bentham was the video referee for the 2007, 2009, and 2012 Challenge Cup finals.

He has also refereed in the 2014 Four Nations final in Wellington, New Zealand

== International ==
- Touch Judge - Great Britain versus Australia, Wigan, Nov 2003
- Referee - Wales versus Scotland, Rugby League World Cup qualifying, 4 November 2007
- Video Referee - France versus England, Four Nations, 24 October 2009
- Video Referee - France versus New Zealand, Four Nations, 31 October 2009
- Referee - Italy versus Serbia, European Cup, 8 November 2009
- Referee - all matches at the 2010 Atlantic Cup
- Referee - Australia versus New Zealand Test, Newcastle, Australia, 16 October 2011
- Referee - Australia versus New Zealand, Four Nations 28 October 2011
- Referee - Wales v Australia, Four Nations, Nov 2011
- Referee - Fiji versus Ireland, Rugby League World Cup, 28 October 2013
- Referee - New Zealand versus France, Rugby League World Cup, 1 November 2013
- Referee - Australia versus Ireland, Rugby League World Cup, 9 November 2013
- Video Referee - Australia versus United States, Rugby League World Cup quarter-final, 16 November 2013
- Video Referee - Samoa versus Fiji, Rugby League World Cup quarter-final, 17 November 2013
- Referee - Australia versus New Zealand, Four Nations, 25 October 2014
- Referee - New Zealand versus England, Four Nations, 8 November 2014
- Referee - New Zealand v Australia, Four Nations final, 15 November 2014
- Video Referee - England versus New Zealand Test series, 2015
- Referee - England versus France, Rugby League World Cup, November 2017
- Referee - Scotland versus Tonga, Rugby League World Cup, November 2017
- Referee - Australia v Samoa Rugby League World Cup quarter-final, 17 November 2017
- Video Referee - England versus New Zealand, 11 November 2018

== Injuries ==
On 4 May 2012, Bentham was refereeing the Super League clash between Wigan Warriors and Hull Kingston Rovers at the DW Stadium live on Sky Sports, when he collided during an off-the-ball incident with Rovers' Shannon McDonnell after 17 minutes, and suffered a fractured tibia. He was given oxygen while being carried off on a stretcher whilst being applauded from the crowds and was taken to the Royal Albert Edward Infirmary in Wigan; touch judge Robert Hicks took over as referee, and Andrew Smith the reserve official took Hicks' place on the line. Wigan went on to win 36–22. Bentham returned to full on-field duties at the start of 2013 Super League Season.

On 16 May 2015, Bentham was refereeing Leeds Rhinos versus Huddersfield Giants at Headingley Carnegie Stadium live on BBC when he did not return after the half time interval due to a hamstring injury. Touch Judge Jonathan Roberts replaced Bentham in the middle as he was the most senior referee having experience in the Championship and League 1 competitions. Reserve Official Phil Graham took Roberts' place on the line. Leeds went on to win 48–16.

On 16 February 2018, Bentham was refereeing Widnes Vikings versus Warrington Wolves at the Halton Stadium live on Sky Sports when Chris Houston collided with him causing him to hit the ground heavily, landing on his back and the 'ref cam' equipment. Bentham had to leave the field due to his injuries. Touch judge Scott Mikalauskas took over as referee, and Marcus Griffiths the Reserve Official took Mikalauskas' place on the line. Mikalauskas placed the collision between Bentham and Houston on report and Houston was subsequently banned for two matches. In the same fixture in 2017, also televised on Sky Sports, Bentham was the referee and Houston knocked him over in that fixture but was found not guilty by an Independent Rules Tribunal. Bentham has not refereed since this incident and it is doubtful he will return to the field due to slipping a disc in his neck.
