= Stade Gilbert Brutus =

Rugby league stadium in France

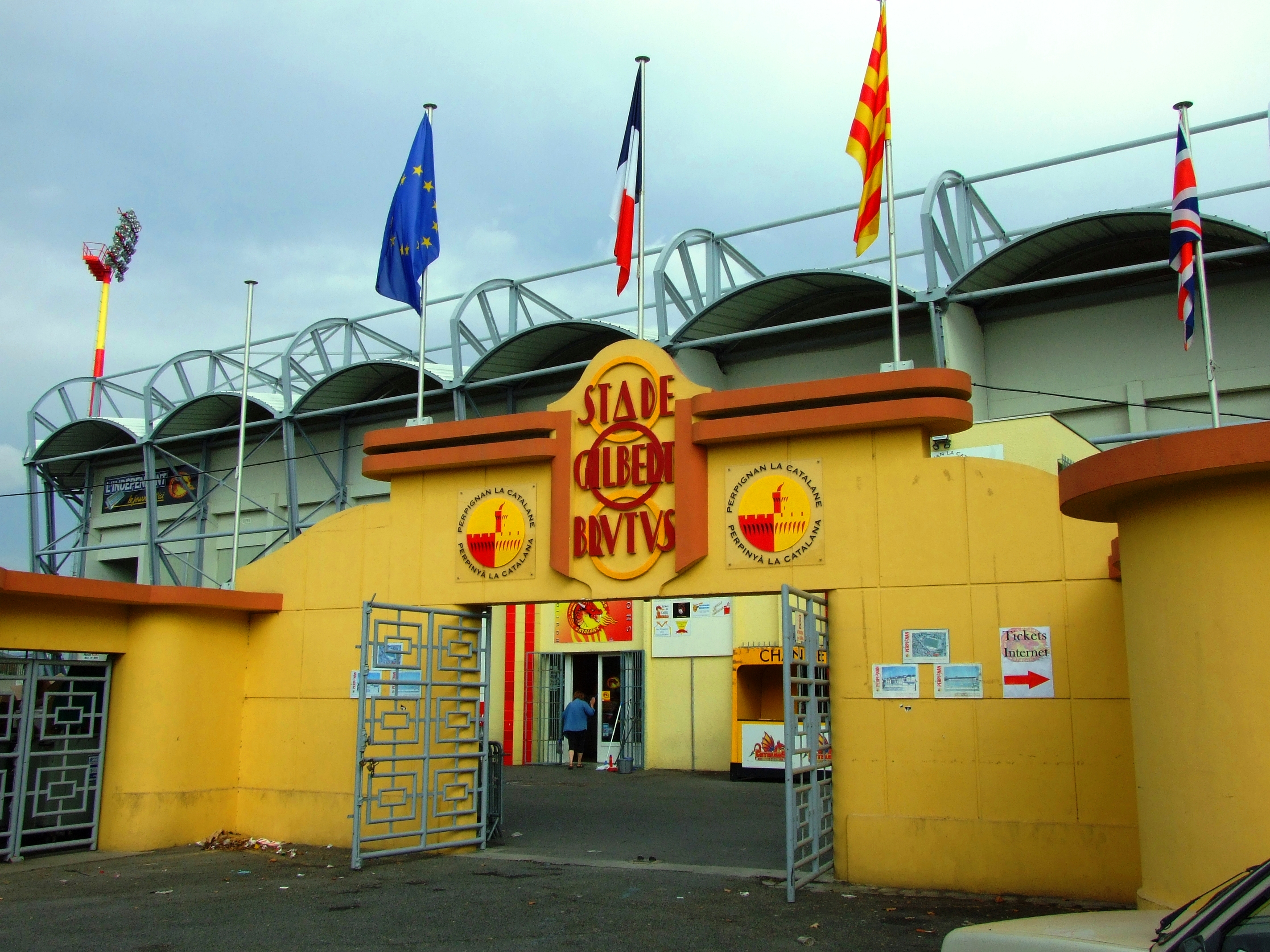
- Interactive map of Stade Gilbert Brutus
- Location: Perpignan, France
- Coordinates: 42°43′23″N 2°53′6.7″E
- Owner: French Rugby League Federation
- Capacity: 13,000
- Surface: Grass

Construction
- Opened: 1962
- Expanded: 2005, 2007, and 2011

Tenant
- Catalans Dragons (2007–present)

Stade Gilbert Brutus is a rugby league stadium in Perpignan, France, which has been the home ground of the Catalans Dragons since 2007.

== History ==
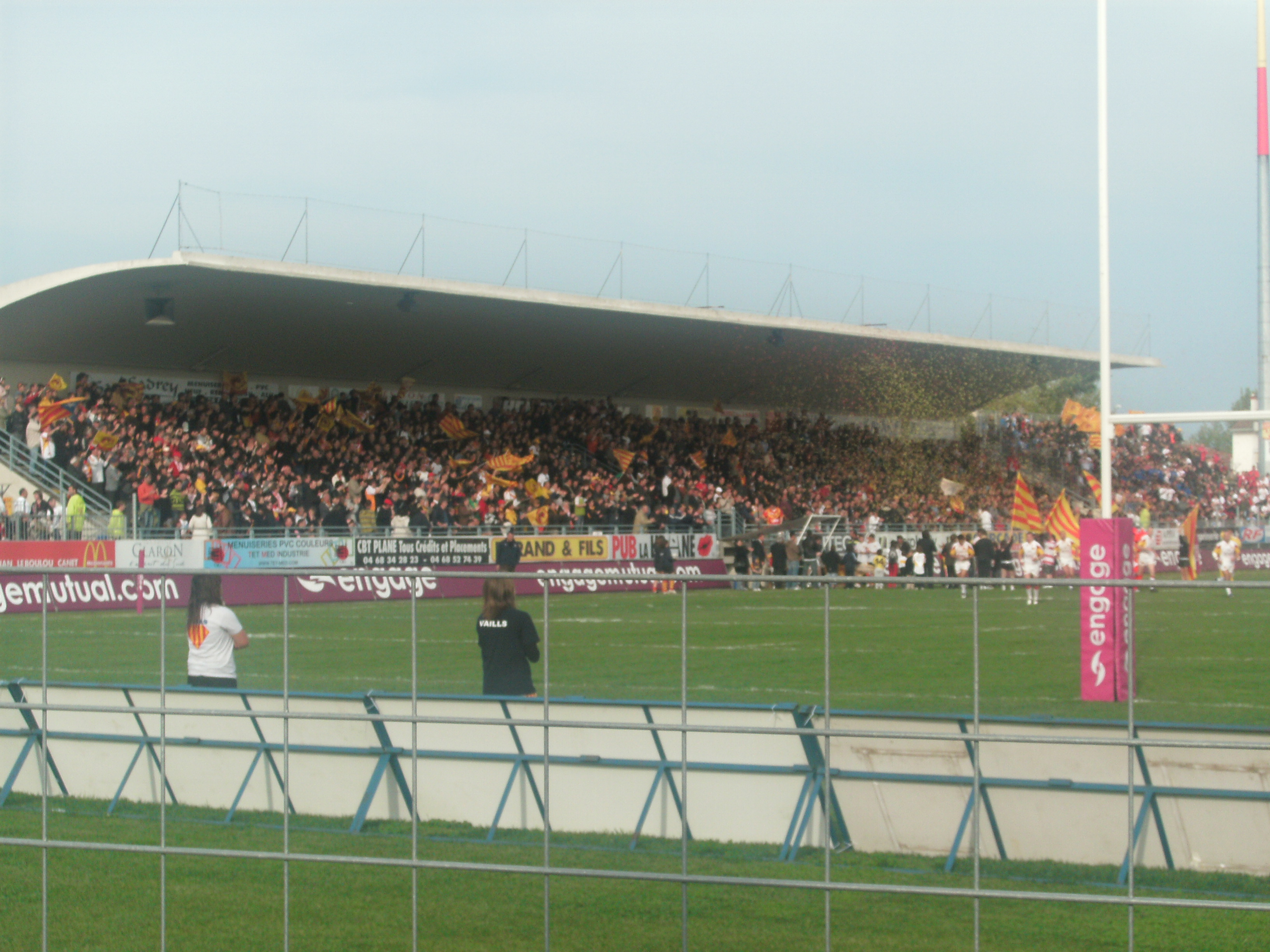
The Tribune Guasch Laborde stand, 2009

The Stade Gilbert Brutus was opened in 1962 and built as the home ground of French Rugby League Championship club XIII Catalan who played at their ground until they merged with AS Saint-Estève in 2000 to form Catalans Dragons whose home ground the stadium has been since 2007.

Throughout the 1970s and 1980s, the ground was used by a variety rugby league and rugby union clubs in Northern Catalonia.

The stadium takes its name from Gilbert Brutus, a French rugby union player, coach, chairman and referee, who was born on 2 August 1887 in Port-Vendres. He was a member of the French resistance in the Second World War and was murdered by the Gestapo on 7 March 1944 in Perpignan.

Before 2007, the stadium held 4,200 with 900 seated. This was deemed expanded for the Catalans Dragons before moving in from the Stade Aimé Giral. Expansion of the stadium began in 2006 with target capacity to 14,000.

The first phase of construction included two covered, all-seater stands, one with hospitality suites. By the end of the 2006 season, the work was finished and Catalans moved back into the stadium for the 2007 season. Further construction in 2010 brought capacity up to 13,000, with three all-seater stands.

== Rugby League Test matches ==
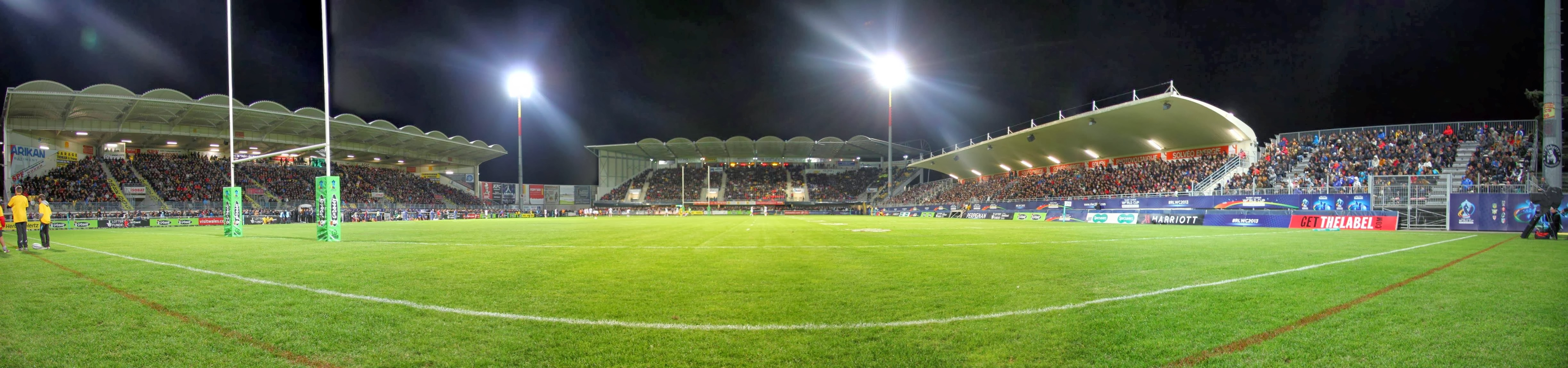
Panorama of Stade Gilbert Brutus in 2013

The Stade Gilbert Brutus has hosted a number of rugby league internationals, the majority of which are home games of the French national rugby league team.

=== Men's ===
Date	Team 1	Score	Team 2	Attendance	Event
11 March 1962	France	23–13	Great Britain	12,500	
2 December 1962	France	17–12	Great Britain	12,500	
8 March 1964	France	5–11	Great Britain	4,326	
6 December 1964	France	18–8	Great Britain	7,150	
28 November 1965	France	11–6	New Zealand	9,000	1965 France vs New Zealand – 2nd Test
16 January 1966	France	18–13	Great Britain	7,255	
25 January 1970	France	11–15	Wales	11,000	
11 November 1971	France	11–27	New Zealand	3,581	1971 France vs New Zealand – 1st Test
29 October 1972	Great Britain	27–21	Australia	6,324	1972 Rugby League World Cup
9 December 1973	France	9–21	Australia	5,109	1973 France vs Australia – 1st Test
19 January 1975	France	9–11	England	7,950	1975 European Rugby League Championship
26 October 1975	France	2–41	Australia	10,440	1975 Rugby League World Cup
23 November 1980	France	6–5	New Zealand	6,000	1980 France vs New Zealand – 1st Test
7 December 1985	France	0–20	New Zealand	5,000	1985 France vs New Zealand – 2nd Test; 1985-1988 Rugby League World Cup
30 November 1986	France	2–44	Australia	6,000	1986 France vs Australia – 1st Test
18 March 1990	France	4–8	Great Britain	6,000	
9 December 1990	France	10–34	Australia	3,428	1990 France vs Australia – 2nd Test; 1989-1992 Rugby League World Cup
27 January 1991	France	10–45	Great Britain	3,965	1989-1992 Rugby League World Cup
16 February 1992	France	12–30	Great Britain	5,688	
13 December 1992	France	18–19	Wales	3,700	
27 October 2007	France	46–16	Scotland	7,000	
29 October 2011	France	46–10	Scotland	10,313	
11 November 2013	France	6–22	Samoa	11,576	2013 Rugby League World Cup
13 October 2017	France	34–12	Jamaica	4,850	
23 October 2021	France	10–30	England	6,000	

=== Women's ===
Date	Team 1	Score	Team 2	Attendance	Event
23 October 2021	France	4–40	England	6,000	

== See also ==
- List of rugby league stadiums by capacity
