= Chris Kendall =

English rugby league referee

- Born: 3 June 1992 (age 34); Huddersfield, West Yorkshire

Christopher Kendall (born 3 June 1992) is an English rugby league referee. He has been a match official at the Rugby League World Cup and took the lead at multiple Super League Grand Finals.

== Career ==
Kendall played rugby league for the Newsome Panthers as a child before moving to Huddersfield Giants at academy level. He played as a halfback, being first choice for this position ahead of Niall Evalds, which encouraged the latter to try out for Salford instead. Kendall also officiated matches at community level.

After his junior playing career, he joined the Rugby Football League referee cadet programme, saying he thought the programme was a great opportunity for people to stay in the sport after playing. He began refereeing matches, initially as a touch judge, in 2012, before becoming a grade 1 referee in 2013. He was appointed a full-time match official in July 2015.

In 2017, he was selected to be a touch judge at the 2017 Rugby League World Cup; earlier that year he had faced some major criticism when the Leigh Centurions owner lambasted referee decisions in the Super League, singling out the first-half performance of Kendall in a match Leigh lost to nothing.

He had a breakout year in 2019, officiating several high-profile matches in the UK and abroad, including serving as referee for the 2019 Super League Grand Final, his first Grand Final appointment in any role. He also refereed the 2020 Grand Final.

In January 2021, International Rugby League approved him to their elite panel of international match officials, saying he was honoured to be selected for the pinnacle of refereeing.

Following a tense match in August 2021, in which Kendall gave a match ban to a player for abusive language towards him during an altercation, Kendall was removed from his next match and sat out fixtures for a week. He had previously been outspoken about the negative effect players being verbally abusive to referees has on the sport. In June 2022, he was verbally abused and physically touched by Bernard Guasch, owner of Catalans Dragons, after a match, leading to Guasch receiving a stadium ban; Guasch responded by saying that he did not want his team to play under English referees.

Kendall served as the video referee for a crucial Super League match in April 2022, controversially overturning two early decisions, putting defending champions St Helens behind (they came back to win). Kendall found himself on the other side of this situation in a July 2022 Magic Weekend match; he initially awarded a late try to Hull KR, which would have seen them win if not controversially overturned by the video referee. In another match a few days later, Kendall gave a straight red card to a player for touching a potentially injured player; while it was agreed that was the punishment for breaking the rule, its enforcement for the second time in the season saw coaches question if the laws should be so strict.

He is set to referee at the 2021 Rugby League World Cup in October and November 2022.

== Matches officiated ==
Statistics accurate as of 18 October 2022. Only matches as principal referee.

Year	Championships (Note: Including Championship (Second Division), 1895 Cup and Super 8s)	Challenge Cup	Super League	World Cup	Other int'l (Note: Including World Club Challenge and Lions tours)	Total
2013	0	1	0	0	0	1
2014	0	1	0	0	0	1
2015	4	2	1	0	0	7
2016	2	3	10	1	0	16
2017	4	2	23	1	0	30
2018	7	3	24	0	0	34
2019	2	3	32	0	2	39
2020	0	3	19	0	1	23
2021	2	3	20	0	0	25
2022	5	2	27	1	0	34
Total	26	23	156	3	3	211

== Personal life ==
In 2022, Kendall had a son, Max. After posting about the birth on Twitter, he received hate messages, including a public reply death threat. He had previously left social media in 2020 after receiving abuse from fans, both for his calls and because the fans were angry they were unable to attend matches behind closed doors during the COVID-19 pandemic. The first episode of Betfred's Rugby League Front Row Heroes short documentary series, produced near the start of the COVID-19 pandemic, was about Kendall; in it he described his volunteer work for the NHS and Kirklees Council.

== See also ==
- RFL match officials
