= Ben Thaler =

English rugby league referee (born 1981)

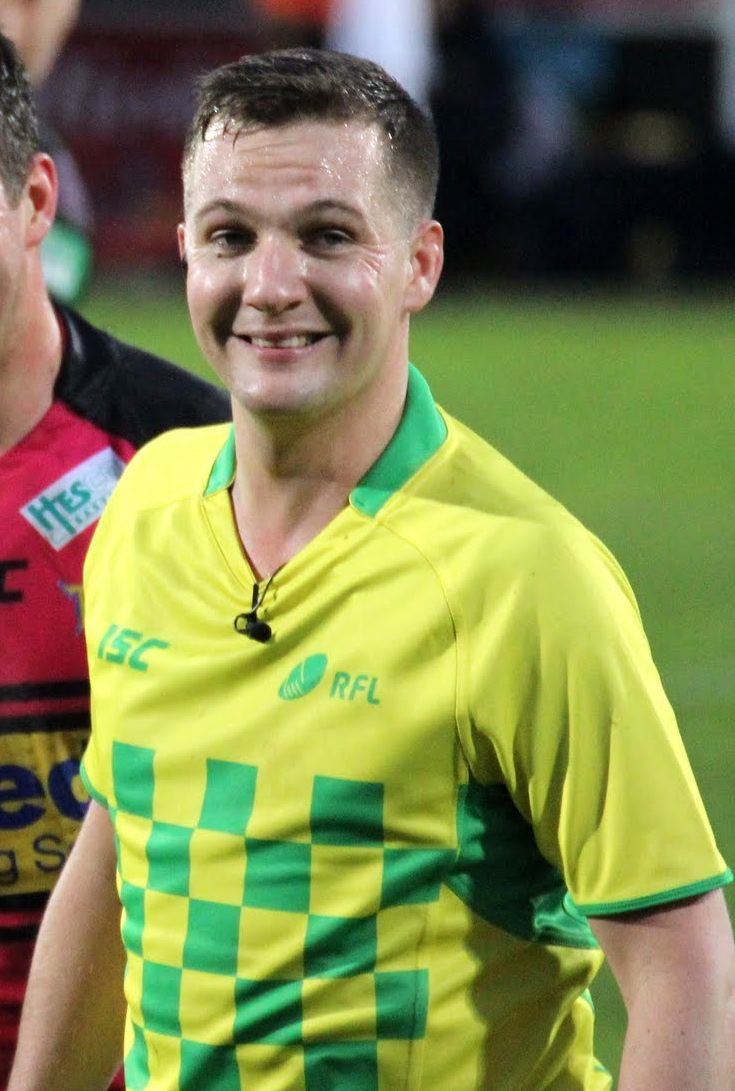
- Full name: Benjamin Drew Thaler
- Born: 30 August 1981 (age 45); Normanton, West Yorkshire, Wakefield, England

Domestic
Years	League	Role
2001-2024	Championship	Referee
2005-2024	Super League	Referee

International
Years	League	Role
2005-2024	IRL listed	Referee

Benjamin Drew Thaler (born 30 August 1981) is a professional rugby league referee and one of the Rugby Football League's Full Time Match Officials. He officiates in the Men's Super League.

On 24 September 2024, Thaler announced that he will be stepping down as a referee, to take up a new role with the RFL.

== Background ==
Thaler was brought up in Normanton, West Yorkshire, England.

== Career ==
Ben's first pro game was against Leigh v York City Knights on 1 July 2001. His first Super League game was against the London Broncos v Leigh on 29 May 2005.

He was a part of a New Zealand referee exchange in 2005.

He was the referee for both the 2015 Super League Grand Final at Old Trafford, and the 2015 Challenge Cup Final at Wembley Stadium.

He was the referee for the 2017 Million Pound Game, which saw Leigh Centurions relegated from Super League, and Hull Kingston Rovers promoted, in a straight swap of the two clubs promoted and relegated from the previous season.

== International ==
Thaler has refereed 19 Internationals to date:

1. Georgia 0 V 60 France 2005 (European Nations Championship)
2. Lebanon 22 V 8 Russia 2006 (World Cup Qualifier)
3. USA 37 V 22 Jamaica 2009 (Atlantic Cup)
4. Wales 6 V 13 Italy 2010 (Friendly)
5. England 18 V 10 Exiles 2012 (International Origin)
6. England 20 V 32 Exiles 2012 (International Origin)
7. Scotland 18 V 30 Ireland 2012 (European Cup)
8. USA 32 V 20 Cook Islands 2013 (World Cup-Group Stage)
9. Tonga 16 V 0 Italy 2013 (World Cup-Group Stage)
10. Wales 14 V 46 Ireland 2014 (European Championship)
11. England 26 V 12 New Zealand 2015 (Test Series)
12. Ireland 4 V 30 Wales 2015 (European Cup)
13. England 20 V 14 New Zealand 2015 (Test Series)
14. Scotland 12 V 54 Australia 2016 (Four Nations)
15. England 29 V 10 Lebanon 2017 (World Cup-Group Stage)
16. Wales 6 V 34 Ireland 2017 (World Cup-Group Stage)
17. England 36 V 18 New Zealand 2018 (Test Match)
18. Jamaica 38 V 8 Canada 2018 (Americas Championship)
19. Jamaica 16 V 10 USA 2018 (Americas Championship)

He was the video referee for Wales v Ireland on 1 November 2009. for the Rugby League European Cup.

He was the video referee for Wales v Scotland on 8 November 2009.

He was the referee and video referee in various 2013 Rugby League World Cup games.

He was the referee and video referee in various games in the 2017 Rugby League World Cup. He went on to be the Video Referee for the Final.
