= James Child =

English rugby league referee

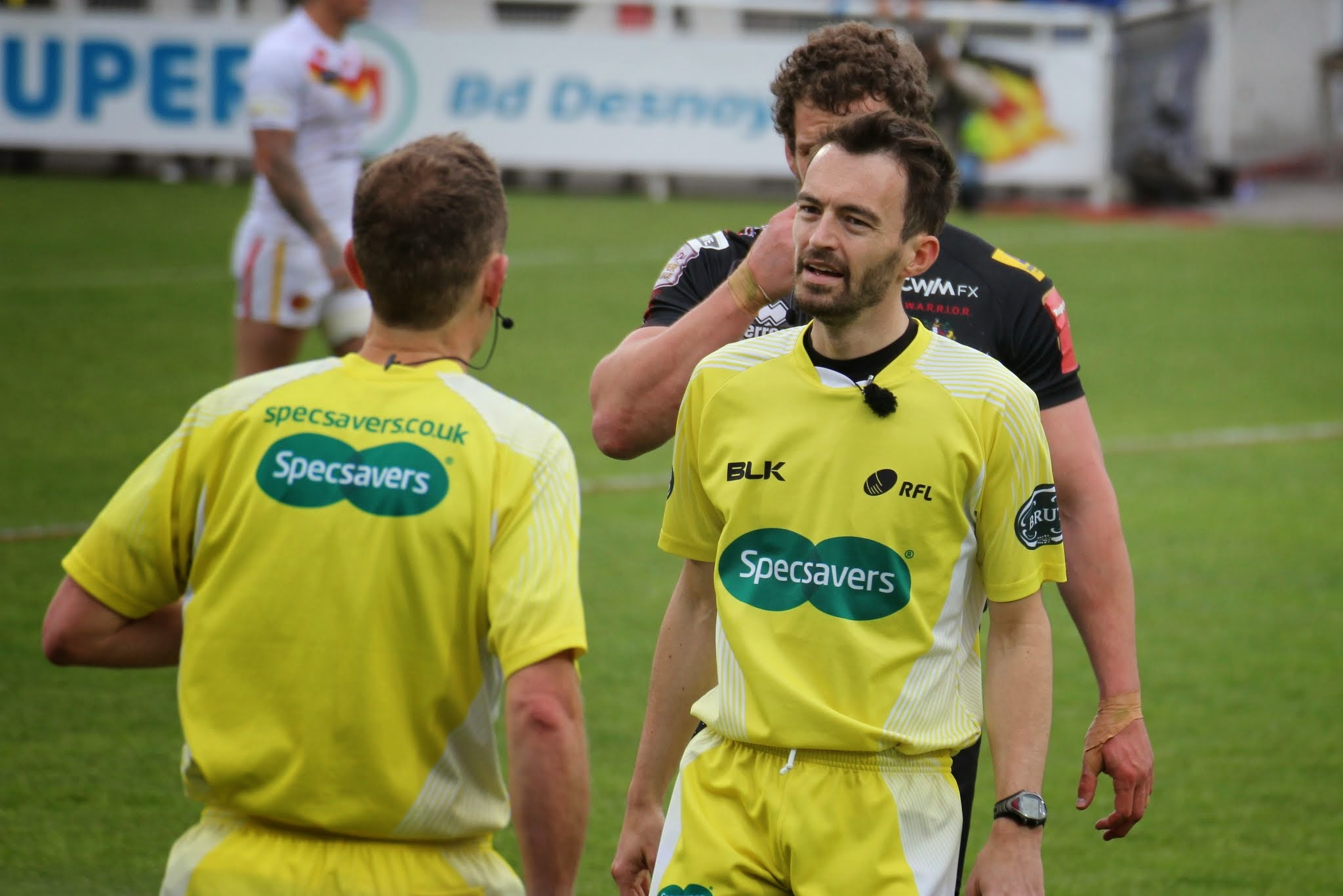
- Full name: James Child
- Born: 4 July 1983 (age 43); Dewsbury, England
- Other occupation: Surveyor

Domestic
Years	League	Role
2006–2009	Championship	Referee
2010–2022	Super League	Referee

International
Years	League	Role
2012–2022	IRL listed	Referee

James Child (born 4 July 1983) is a former English rugby league referee. He was one of the Rugby Football League's Full Time Match Officials.

On 19 December 2022, Child announced that he would be stepping down as referee, ahead of the 2023 season.

== Referee career ==
James started refereeing at the age of 11 years as a member of the Dewsbury & Batley Rugby League Referees' Society. Since then he has enjoyed many notable successes, particularly as a touch judge having officiated at the 2006, 2007 and 2008 Challenge Cup Finals, the 2007 and 2008 Super League Grand Finals and most notably the 2008 Rugby League World Cup Final.

As a referee, his first professional game was Gateshead Thunder v Workington Town on 17 April 2006, before making his Super League debut on 15 March 2009 with Wakefield Trinity Wildcats v Catalans Dragons. This came a week after he officiated the Rugby League Varsity Match between Oxford University and Cambridge University at the Twickenham Stoop.

On 11 January 2010, he was promoted to the RFL's elite refereeing squad for 2010's Super League XV.

In December 2022, Child retired as a match official after more than 10 years.

== Personal life ==
He is a member of the Dewsbury and Batley Rugby League Referees' Society.

He combines his role as Super League referee, with a part-time job as a Chartered surveyor for Leeds City Council.

In February 2021, in an interview for BBC Sport, Child confirmed that he is gay, something known to his family, friends and colleagues for some time.
