= 2007 Wigan Warriors season =

- Super League XII Rank: 6th
- Play-off result: Lost in Elimination Final
- Challenge Cup: Semi-finals
- 2007 record: Wins: 18; draws: 1; losses: 12
- Points scored: For: 621; against: 527

Team information
- Stadium: JJB Stadium

Top scorers
- Tries: Trent Barrett (18)
- Points: Pat Richards (320)
← 2006	List of seasons	2008 →

The Wigan Warriors played in the Super League and Challenge Cup in the 2007 season.

== Fixtures and results ==
Round	Opponent	Result	Wigan	Oppo	Date	Venue	Crowd	Competition
N	Huddersfield Giants	Lost	22	24	21 January 2007	Galpharm Stadium	3,960	Friendly
N	Salford City Reds	Won	20	15	31 January 2007	The Willows	2,902	Friendly
N	Whitehaven†	Lost	0	30	4 February 2007	Recreation Ground		Friendly
1	Warrington Wolves	Lost	10	16	9 February 2007	JJB Stadium	21,693	Super League XII
2	Catalans Dragons	Won	18	16	17 February 2007	Gilbert Brutus	7,052	Super League XII
3	Bradford Bulls	Lost	28	32	24 February 2007	Grattan Stadium	12,798	Super League XII
4	Hull Kingston Rovers	Lost	16	26	2 March 2007	JJB Stadium	15,178	Super League XII
5	Harlequins RL	Won	16	12	9 March 2007	JJB Stadium	14,971	Super League XII
6	Salford City Reds	Won	25	6	16 March 2007	The Willows	6,025	Super League XII
7	Hull F.C.	Won	30	20	23 March 2007	KC Stadium	12,755	Super League XII
CC4	Widnes Vikings	Won	34	24	1 April 2007	Halton Stadium	6,006	Rugby League Challenge Cup
8	St. Helens	Lost	14	32	6 April 2007	JJB Stadium	24,028	Super League XII
9	Leeds Rhinos	Won	20	18	10 April 2007	Headingley Stadium	16,465	Super League XII
10	Huddersfield Giants	Lost	16	41	15 April 2007	Galpharm Stadium	7,170	Super League XII
11	Wakefield Trinity Wildcats	Won	44	10	20 April 2007	JJB Stadium	14,108	Super League XII
12	Salford City Reds	Won	50	24	27 April 2007	The Willows	6,603	Super League XII
13	St. Helens	Lost	18	34	5 May 2007	Millennium Stadium	32,384	Super League XII
CC5	Leeds Rhinos	Won	22	18	12 May 2007	Headingley Stadium	8,982	Rugby League Challenge Cup
14	Hull Kingston Rovers	Lost	10	12	18 May 2007	JJB Stadium	13,538	Super League XII
15	Hull F.C.	Won	47	16	26 May 2007	JJB Stadium	14,314	Super League XII
16	Harlequins RL	Lost	8	18	2 June 2007	Twickenham Stoop	5,657	Super League XII
CCQF	Harlequins RL	Won	25	6	8 June 2007	JJB Stadium	10,835	Rugby League Challenge Cup
17	Catalans Dragons	Won	30	0	15 June 2007	JJB Stadium	12,641	Super League XII
18	Wakefield Trinity Wildcats	Lost	6	32	1 July 2007	Belle Vue	8,126	Super League XII
19	Bradford Bulls	Won	25	18	6 July 2007	JJB Stadium	15,107	Super League XII
20	Leeds Rhinos	Won	18	2	13 July 2007	JJB Stadium	14,544	Super League XII
21	St. Helens	Lost	12	19	20 July 2007	Knowsley Road	14,293	Super League XII
CCSF	Catalans Dragons	Lost	24	36	29 July 2007	Halliwell Jones Stadium	10,218	Rugby League Challenge Cup
22	Warrington Wolves	Lost	24	43	5 August 2007	Halliwell Jones Stadium	12,152	Super League XII
23	Huddersfield Giants	Won	20	12	10 August 2007	JJB Stadium	12,744	Super League XII
24	Harlequins RL	Draw	16	16	18 August 2007	Twickenham Stoop	3,200	Super League XII
25	Salford City Reds	Won	40	16	31 August 2007	JJB Stadium	13,611	Super League XII
26	Hull Kingston Rovers	Won	40	24	9 September 2007	Craven Park	7,370	Super League XII
27	St. Helens	Won	20	12	14 September 2007	JJB Stadium	22,036	Super League XII
	Bradford Bulls	Won	31	30	21 September 2007	Grattan Stadium	9,055	Super League XII Play-offs
	Hull F.C.	Won	21	18	29 September 2007	KC Stadium	16,291	Super League XII Play-offs
	Leeds Rhinos	Lost	6	36	5 October 2007	Headingley Stadium	16,112	Super League XII Play-offs

↑ Wigan Warriors only played a second grade squad against Whitehaven, mostly made up of players from the Wigan Warriors Academy.

== League table ==
Final League Table

Pos	Team	Pld	W	D	L	PF	PA	PD	Pts	Qualification
1	St Helens (L)	27	19	0	8	783	422	+361	38	Semifinal
2	Leeds Rhinos (C)	27	18	1	8	747	487	+260	37	Semifinal
3	Bradford Bulls	27	17	1	9	778	560	+218	33 (Note: Bradford deducted 2 points for salary cap breaches.)	Elimination semifinal
4	Hull F.C.	27	14	2	11	573	553	+20	30	Elimination semifinal
5	Huddersfield Giants	27	13	1	13	638	543	+95	27	Elimination semifinal
6	Wigan Warriors	27	15	1	11	621	527	+94	27 (Note: Wigan deducted 4 points for salary cap breaches.)	Elimination semifinal
7	Warrington Wolves	27	13	0	14	693	736	−43	26	
8	Wakefield Trinity Wildcats	27	11	1	15	596	714	−118	23	
9	Harlequins	27	10	3	14	495	636	−141	23	
10	Catalans Dragons	27	10	1	16	570	685	−115	21	
11	Hull Kingston Rovers	27	10	0	17	491	723	−232	20	
12	Salford City Reds (R)	27	6	1	20	475	874	−399	13	Relegation to National League One

Source: Rugby League Project
Rules for classification: 1) Points; 2) Points difference; 3) Number of points scored;
(C) Champions; (L) League Leaders' Shield Winners; (R) Relegated
Notes:

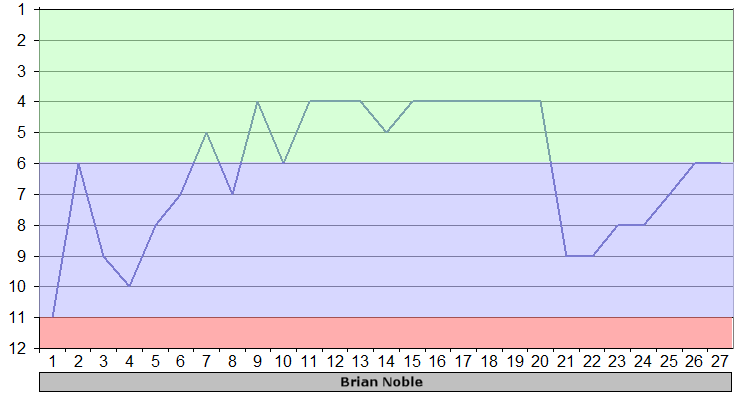

Wigan Warriors round by round progress during the 2007 Super League season

== 2007 Full squad ==
Number	Player	Position	Previous club
1	Chris Ashton^{1}	Fullback	Wigan Warriors Academy
2	Mark Calderwood	Winger	Leeds Rhinos
3	Phil Bailey	Centre	Cronulla Sharks
4	Michael Withers^{1}	Centre	Bradford Bulls
5	Pat Richards	Winger	Wests Tigers
6	Trent Barrett	Stand Off	St George Illawarra Dragons
7	Thomas Leuluai	Scrum-half	Harlequins RL
8	Stuart Fielden	Prop forward	Bradford Bulls
9	Mickey Higham	Hooker	Bradford Bulls
10	Iafeta Paleaaesina	Prop forward	New Zealand Warriors
11	Gareth Hock	Second Rower	Wigan Warriors Academy
12	Bryan Fletcher	Second Rower	South Sydney Rabbitohs
13	Sean O'Loughlin	Loose forward	Wigan Warriors Academy
14	David Vaealiki	Centre	Parramatta Eels
16	Shane Millard	Hooker	Leeds Rhinos
18	Paul Prescott	Prop forward	Wigan Warriors Academy
19	Harrison Hansen	Second Rower	Wigan Warriors Academy
20	Darrell Goulding	Centre	Wigan Warriors Academy
21	Danny Hill	Second Rower	Hull
22	Joel Tomkins	Second Rower	Wigan Warriors Academy
23	Liam Colbon	Winger	Wigan Warriors Academy
24	Eamon O'Carroll	Prop forward	Wigan Warriors Academy
25	Michael McIlorum	Hooker	Wigan Warriors Academy
26	Thomas Coyle	Scrum-half	Wigan Warriors Academy
27	Sean Gleeson^{1}	Centre	Wigan Warriors Academy
28	Mark Flanagan	Stand Off	Bradford Bulls

^{1} Denotes a player who left Wigan Warriors during 2007. For more information see Transfers Section

== Transfers ==
Transfer for 2007 (In)

Name	Transferred from	Fee	Date signed
Phil Bailey	Cronulla Sharks	Free Transfer	May 2006
Trent Barrett	St George Illawarra Dragons	Free Transfer	May 2006
Thomas Leuluai	Harlequins RL	Free Transfer	December 2006
Shane Millard	Leeds Rhinos	Free Transfer	December 2006
Michael Withers	Bradford Bulls	Free Transfer	December 2006
Mark Flanagan	Bradford Bulls	£10,900	January 2007

Transfer for 2007 (Out)

Name	Transferred to	Fee	Date released
Brett Dallas	Retired		September 2006
Michael Dobson	Canberra Raiders	Return From Loan	September 2006
Wayne Godwin	Hull	Free Transfer	September 2006
Scott Logan	Canberra Raiders	Free Transfer	September 2006
Chris Melling	Harlequins RL	Free Transfer	September 2006
Oliver Wilkes	Widnes Vikings	Free Transfer	September 2006
Bryn Hargreaves	St. Helens	Released	October 2006
Danny Sculthorpe	Wakefield Trinity Wildcats	Released	October 2006
Danny Tickle	Hull	Free Transfer	October 2006
Danny Orr	Harlequins RL	Free Transfer	October 2006
Nathan McAvoy	Bradford Bulls	Released	February 2007
Sean Gleeson	Wakefield Trinity Wildcats	Released	May 2007
Michael Withers	Retired		June 2007
Chris Ashton	Northampton Saints	Released	August 2007

2007 Loans (Out)

Name	Loan to	Loan started	Loan ended
Sean Gleeson	Huddersfield Giants	February 2007	April 2007
Danny Hill	Hull Kingston Rovers	April 2007	May 2007
Joel Tomkins	Widnes Vikings	August 2007	Current

== Club personnel 2008 ==
President – Peter Higginbottom Life Members – Joe Egan, Billy Blan, Johnny Lawrenson

DIRECTORS

Owner and chairman – Ian Lenagan (as from 1 December 2007) company secretary – Paul Wright

RUGBY

Head Coach – Brian Noble Assistant Coach – Phil Veivers
