= 2006 Wigan Warriors season =

British rugby league event

- Super League XI Rank: 8th
- Play-off result: Did not qualify
- Challenge Cup: Fifth Round
- 2006 record: Wins: 13; draws: 0; losses: 17
- Points scored: For: 644; against: 715

Team information
- Stadium: JJB Stadium

Top scorers
- Tries: Chris Ashton (14)
- Points: Michael Dobson (142)
← 2005	List of seasons	2007 →

The Wigan Warriors played in the Super League and Challenge Cup in the 2006 season.

== Results ==
Round	Opponent	Result	Wigan	Oppo	Date	Venue	Crowd
1	Catalans Dragons	Loss	30	39	11/02/06	Stade Aimé Giral	11,122
2	Leeds Rhinos	Loss	24	16	17/02/06	JJB Stadium	17,281
3	Huddersfield Giants	Win	36	20	24/02/06	JJB Stadium	11,623
4	Salford City Reds	Loss	10	28	03/03/06	The Willows	5,494
5	Warrington Wolves	Loss	12	24	10/03/06	JJB Stadium	16,640
6	Castleford Tigers	Loss	18	38	19/03/02	The Jungle	9,021
7	Bradford Bulls	Loss	12	34	24/03/06	Gratten Stadium	11,644
CC4	Wakefield Wildcats	Win	32	22	02/04/06	Atlantic Solutions Stadium	3,123
8	Wakefield Wildcats	Lose	14	40	07/04/06	Atlantic Solutions Stadium	4,557
9	St Helens	Lose	10	48	14/04/06	Knowsley Road	17,500
10	Harlequins RL	Lose	18	30	17/04/06	JJB Stadium	12,329
11	Huddersfield Giants	Win	46	14	22/04/06	Galpharm Stadium	5,236
12	Hull FC	Loss	12	54	30/04/06	Galpharm Stadium	12,722
13	Castleford Tigers	Loss	24	30	05/05/06	The Jungle	12,484
14	Wakefield Wildcats	Loss	8	10	13/05/06	Atlantic Solutions Stadium	3,733
CC5	Salford City Reds	Loss	4	16	19/05/06	The Willows	5,888
15	St Helens	Loss	14	28	27/05/06	JJB Stadium	18,358
16	Leeds Rhinos	Loss	22	44	09/06/06	Headingley Stadium	14,989
17	Catalans Dragons	Win	24	18	18/06/06	JJB Stadium	11,250
18	Warrington Wolves	Win	30	12	23/06/06	JJB Stadium	16,103
19	Harlequins RL	Win	26	24	01/07/06	Twickenham Stoop	4,115
20	Wakefield Wildcats	Win	42	24	07/07/06	JJB Stadium	13,686
21	Salford City Reds	Win	20	12	14/07/06	JJB Stadium	13,613
22	Warrington Wolves	Lose	20	22	23/07/06	Halliwell Jones Stadium	13,024
23	Catalans Dragons	Win	40	4	04/08/06	JJB Stadium	12,647
24	Leeds Rhinos	Win	20	18	11/08/06	Headingley Stadium	15,066
25	Huddersfield Giants	Win	14	10	18/08/06	JJB Stadium	14,092
26	Bradford Bulls	Win	38	16	01/09/06	JJB Stadium	15,830
27	Harlequins RL	Loss	30	31	10/09/06	Twickenham Stoop	5,737
28	Hull FC	Win	38	16	15/09/06	JJB Stadium	16,554

- CC indicates Challenge Cup matches along with the round number.

== League Table ==
Pos	Team	Pld	W	D	L	PF	PA	PD	Pts	Qualification
1	St Helens (L, C)	28	24	0	4	939	430	+509	48	Semi-final
2	Hull F.C.	28	20	0	8	720	578	+142	40	Semi-final
3	Leeds Rhinos	28	19	0	9	869	543	+326	38	Elimination play-offs
4	Bradford Bulls	28	16	2	10	802	568	+234	32 (Note: Bradford deducted 2 points for salary cap breaches in 2005.)	Elimination play-offs
5	Salford City Reds	28	13	0	15	600	539	+61	26	Elimination play-offs
6	Warrington Wolves	28	13	0	15	743	721	+22	26	Elimination play-offs
7	Harlequins	28	11	1	16	556	823	−267	23	
8	Wigan Warriors	28	12	0	16	644	715	−71	22 (Note: Wigan deducted 2 points for salary cap breaches in 2005.)	
9	Huddersfield Giants	28	11	0	17	609	753	−144	22	
10	Wakefield Trinity Wildcats	28	10	0	18	591	717	−126	20	
11	Castleford Tigers (R)	28	9	1	18	575	968	−393	19	Relegation to National League One
12	Catalans Dragons (X)	28	8	0	20	601	894	−293	16	

Source: Rugby League Project
Rules for classification: 1) Points; 2) Points difference; 3) Number of points scored;
(C) Champions; (L) League Leaders' Shield Winners; (R) Relegated; (X) Exempt from relegation

== Statistics ==
Tries

#	Name	Tries
1	Chris Ashton	15
2	Pat Richards	12
3	Brett Dallas	10
4	Bryan Fletcher	10
4	Sean O'Loughlin	10

Goals

#	Name	Goals
1	Michael Dobson	57
2	Danny Tickle	33
3	Pat Richards	12
4	Danny Orr	5
5	Denis Moran	1

Points

#	Name	Points
1	Michael Dobson	134
2	Danny Tickle	78
3	Pat Richards	72
4	Chris Ashton	60
5	Brett Dallas	40

Appearances

#	Name	Appearances
1	Sean O'Loughlin	30
2	Chris Ashton	29
3	Mickey Higham	29
4	Danny Orr	26
5	Pat Richards	26

== 2006 squad ==
Number	Player	Position	Previous club
1	Kris Radlinski	Full back	Wigan Warriors Youth Development
2	Mark Calderwood	Winger	Leeds Rhinos
3	Pat Richards	Centre	Wests Tigers
4	David Vaealiki	Centre	Parramatta Eels
5	Brett Dallas	Winger	North Sydney Bears
6	Danny Orr	Stand off	Castleford Tigers
7	Denis Moran	Scrum half	London Broncos
8	Scott Logan	Prop	South Sydney Rabbitohs
9	Mickey Higham	Hooker	Bradford Bulls
10	Iafeta Paleaaesina	Prop	New Zealand Warriors
11	Gareth Hock	Second rower	Wigan Warriors Youth Development
12	Bryan Fletcher	Second rower	South Sydney Rabbitohs
13	Sean O'Loughlin	Loose forward	Wigan Warriors Youth Development
14	Kevin Brown	Stand off	Wigan Warriors Youth Development
15	Danny Tickle	Second rower	Halifax
16	Bryn Hargreaves	Prop	Wigan Warriors Youth Development
17	Jerry Seu Seu	Prop	New Zealand Warriors
18	Wayne Godwin	Hooker	Castleford Tigers
19	Harrison Hansen	Second rower	Wigan Warriors Youth Development
20	Michael Dobson	Scrum half	Canberra Raiders
21	Chris Melling	Winger	Wigan Warriors Youth Development
22	Joel Tomkins	Second rower	Wigan Warriors Youth Development
23	Paul Prescott	Prop	Wigan Warriors Youth Development
24	Darrell Goulding	Centre	Wigan Warriors Youth Development
25	Sean Gleeson	Centre	Wigan Warriors Youth Development
26	John Walker	Centre	Wigan Warriors Youth Development
27	Thomas Coyle	Scrum half	Wigan Warriors Youth Development
28	Michael McIlorum	Hooker	Wigan Warriors Youth Development
29	Chris Ashton	Full back	Wigan Warriors Youth Development
30	Liam Colbon	Winger	Wigan Warriors Youth Development
31	Tim Jonkers	Second rower	Salford City Reds
32	Oliver Wilkes	Prop	Whitehaven
33	Eamon O'Carroll	Prop	Wigan Warriors Youth Development
35	Nathan McAvoy	Centre	Leeds Rhinos
36	Danny Hill	Second rower	Hull
37	Stuart Fielden	Prop	Bradford Bulls

== Key players ==
Key players for Wigan Warriors in 2006 were:

- Chris Ashton was brought in to the Wigan squad at the start of 2006 as replacement for the injured Kris Radlinski. Ashton had impressed on his debut for Wigan in 2005, scoring two tries against Huddersfield Giants but in 2006 he showed good skill, pace and talent and impressed many Wigan fans and people within rugby league. He finished the 2006 season as the leading try scorer at Wigan and his support play throughout the season was excellent. Although some criticism was made about his defensive abilities, he did earn a call into the England squad at the end of the year. Ashton was one of the most consistent players for Wigan through the 2006 and was a contender for the Young Player of the Year award.
- Michael Dobson was signed by Wigan after his loan finished with Catalans Dragons as a replacement for Denis Moran, who had been released by Wigan a week earlier. Dobson had impressed for Catalans Dragons, but when he signed for Wigan, they were at the bottom of the league and facing relegation at the end of the season. His talents, organisation skills and goal kicking were a big factor in Wigan surviving relegation. In 2006 Michael Dobson was the most consistent goal kicker in Rugby League.
- Stuart Fielden signed for Wigan from Bradford Bulls on 22 June 2006 for a Super League record transfer fee of £450,000. Fielden was regarded as one of the best props in the world by many, and his influence in the Wigan team could clearly be seen. He was strong in both attack and defence and offered leadership and inspiration to the rest of the Wigan players. Fielden was one of the main reasons that Wigan avoided relegation in 2006; not only did he provide a physical presence on the pitch, he offered new hope to Wigan fans and players.

== Transfers ==
2006 transfer (in)

Name	Signed from	Fee	Date
Pat Richards	Wests Tigers	2005
Iafeta Paleaaesina	New Zealand Warriors	2005
Scott Logan	South Sydney Rabbitohs	2005
Bryan Fletcher	South Sydney Rabbitohs	2005
Mark Calderwood	Leeds Rhinos	2005
Mickey Higham	Bradford Bulls	2005
Michael Dobson	Canberra Raiders	2006
Oliver Wilkes	Whitehaven	2006
Jordan James	Swinton Lions	2006
Nathan McAvoy	Leeds Rhinos	2006
Danny Hill	Hull	2006
Stuart Fielden	Bradford Bulls	£450,000	2006

2006 transfer (out)

Name	Sold To	Fee	Date
Stephen Wild	Huddersfield Giants	2005
Martin Aspinwall	Huddersfield Giants	2005
Brian Carney	Newcastle Knights	2005
Terry Newton	Bradford Bulls	2005
Jerome Guisset	Catalans Dragons	2005
Andrew Farrell	Saracens F.C.	2005
David Allen	Widnes Vikings	2005
Bob Beswick	Widnes Vikings	2005
James Coyle	Widnes Vikings	2005
Desi Williams	Hull Kingston Rovers	2005
Liam Botham	Retired	2005
Lee Jewitt	Cronulla Sharks	2005
Denis Moran	Released	2006
Jerry Seu Seu	Retired	2006
Jordan James	Widnes Vikings	2006
Kevin Brown	Huddersfield Giants	2006
Kris Radlinski	Retired	2006
Scott Logan	Canberra Raiders	2006
Michael Dobson	Canberra Raiders	2006
Wayne Godwin	Hull	2006
Danny Tickle	Hull	2006
Bryn Hargreaves	St. Helens	2006
Oliver Wilkes	Widnes Vikings	2006
Chris Melling	Harlequins RL	2006

2006 loans (in)

Name	Signed from	Loan started	Loan ended
Tim Jonkers	Salford City Reds	March 2006	May 2006

2006 loans (out)

Name	Loan to	Loan started	Loan ended
Bryn Hargreaves	Leigh Centurions	June 2006	September 2006
Paul Prescott	Leigh Centurions	June 2006	September 2006
Jordan James	Widnes Vikings	May 2006	September 2006
Oliver Wilkes	Widnes Vikings	May 2006	September 2006
Kevin Brown	Huddersfield Giants	June 2006	September 2006

== Staff ==
- Chief executive – Carol Banks
- Chief administrator – Mary Sharkey
- Head coach – Brian Noble
- Head coach – Ian Millward (sacked April 2006)
- Chairman – Maurice P. Lindsay
