= 2008 Wigan Warriors season =

- Super League XIII Rank: 4th
- Play-off result: Lost in Elimination Final
- Challenge Cup: Quarter-finals
- 2008 record: Wins: 15; draws: 3; losses: 12
- Points scored: For: 648; against: 698

Team information
- Stadium: JJB Stadium

Top scorers
- Tries: Pat Richards (21)
- Points: Pat Richards (375)
← 2007	List of seasons	2009 →

The 2008 Wigan Warriors season saw the club compete in Super League XIII as well as the 2008 Challenge Cup tournament.

== Season preview ==
Wigan will be looking to continue their return to the top of Super League after finishing 6th in 2007. During 2008 Wigan will continue to rebuild their squad under coach Brian Noble but they will have a new owner and chairman in Ian Lenagan from 1 December 2007 after Maurice Lindsay retired and Dave Whelan decided to sell the club.

== Full squad ==
No	Player	Position	Weight (kg)	Height (m)	Age	Overseas	Previous club
1	Richie Mathers	Full back	96	1.88	24	No	Gold Coast Titans
2	Mark Calderwood	Right wing	86	1.85	26	No	Leeds Rhinos
3	Darrell Goulding	Right centre	90	1.82	19	No	Wigan Warriors Academy
4	George Carmont	Left centre	91	1.80	29	Yes	Newcastle Knights
5	Pat Richards	Left wing	99	1.91	25	Yes	Wests Tigers
6	Trent Barrett	Stand off	94	1.82	30	Yes	St George Illawarra Dragons
7	Thomas Leuluai‡	Scrum half	85	1.71	22	No	Harlequins RL
8	Stuart Fielden	Prop	108	1.91	28	No	Bradford Bulls
9	Mickey Higham	Hooker	86	1.73	27	No	Bradford Bulls
10	Iafeta Paleaaesina	Prop	118	1.87	25	Yes	New Zealand Warriors
11	Gareth Hock	Second row	92	1.88	24	No	Wigan Warriors Academy
12	Phil Bailey	Second row	93	1.89	27	Yes	Cronulla Sharks
13	Sean O'Loughlin	Loose forward	93	1.87	25	No	Wigan Warriors Academy
14	Liam Colbon	Right wing	92	1.87	23	No	Wigan Warriors Academy
15	Andy Coley	Prop	108	1.89	29	No	Salford City Reds
16	Harrison Hansen‡	Second row	89	1.84	22	No	Wigan Warriors Academy
17	Michael McIlorum	Hooker	79	1.74	20	No	Wigan Warriors Academy
19	Paul Prescott	Prop	99	1.90	21	No	Wigan Warriors Academy
20	Karl Pryce	Centre	118	1.98	21	No	Gloucester RU
21	Cameron Phelps	Centre	89	1.78	23	Yes	Canterbury Bulldogs
22	Joel Tomkins	Second row	95	1.88	20	No	Wigan Warriors Academy
23	Ben Kavanagh (On loan To Widnes Vikings)	Second row	107	1.84	20	No	Wigan Warriors Academy
24	Eamon O'Carroll	Prop	103	1.80	20	No	Wigan Warriors Academy
25	Thomas Coyle (On loan to Halifax)	Scrum half	83	1.71	20	No	Wigan Warriors Academy
26	Nicky Stanton	Right wing	85	1.80	21	No	Wigan Warriors Academy
27	Lee Mossop	Prop	104	1.85	19	No	Wigan Warriors Academy
28	Mark Flanagan	Loose forward	90	1.74	20	No	Bradford Bulls
29	Sam Tomkins	Stand off	77	1.80	19	No	Wigan Warriors Academy
30	Chris Tuson	Second row			18	No	Wigan Warriors Academy
31	Shaun Ainscough	Left wing	86	1.73	18	No	Wigan Warriors Academy
32	Tim Smith	Scrum half	92	1.80	23	Yes	Parramatta Eels
40	Sam Reay†	Full back			23	No	Wigan Warriors Academy

† Added to the squad for pre-season friendlies. †† Added to the squad on 27 May 2008. ‡ Qualify as non-quota players because they were playing in the British Federation before they were 21 years of age.

== Transfers ==
Transfer for 2008 (in)

Name	Transferred from	Fee	Date signed
Andy Coley	Salford City Reds	Free transfer	September 2007
Richie Mathers	Gold Coast Titans	Free transfer	November 2007
George Carmont	Newcastle Knights	Free transfer	November 2007
Karl Pryce	Gloucester Rugby Union	Free transfer	December 2007
Cameron Phelps	Canterbury Bulldogs	Free transfer	May 2008
Tim Smith	Parramatta Eels	Free transfer	May 2008

Transfer for 2008 (out)

Name	Transferred to	Fee	Date released
Bryan Fletcher	Retired	N/A	September 2007
David Vaealiki	Manly Sea Eagles	Released	October 2007
Shane Millard	Retired	N/A	October 2007
Danny Hill	Widnes Vikings	Released	November 2007
Ben Kavanagh	Widnes Vikings	Free transfer	June 2008
Nicky Stanton	Leigh Centurions	Free transfer	September 2008

2008 loans (out)

Name	Loan to	Loan started	Loan ended
Ben Kavanagh	Widnes Vikings	February 2008	June 2008

Super League XIII
Pos	Team	Pld	W	D	L	PF	PA	PD	Pts	Qualification
1	St. Helens (L)	27	21	1	5	940	457	+483	43	Semi-final
2	Leeds Rhinos (C)	27	21	0	6	863	413	+450	42	Semi-final
3	Catalans Dragons	27	16	2	9	694	625	+69	34	Elimination semi-finals
4	Wigan Warriors	27	13	3	11	648	698	−50	29	Elimination semi-finals
5	Bradford Bulls	27	14	0	13	705	625	+80	28	Elimination semi-finals
6	Warrington Wolves	27	14	0	13	690	713	−23	28	Elimination semi-finals
7	Hull Kingston Rovers	27	11	1	15	564	713	−149	23	
8	Wakefield Trinity Wildcats	27	11	0	16	574	760	−186	22	
9	Harlequins	27	11	0	16	569	763	−194	22	
10	Huddersfield Giants	27	10	1	16	638	681	−43	21	
11	Hull F.C.	27	8	1	18	538	699	−161	17	
12	Castleford Tigers	27	7	1	19	593	869	−276	15	

Source: superleague.co.uk
Rules for classification: 1st on competition points; 2nd on match points difference.
Competition points: for win = 2; for draw = 1; for loss = 0.
(C) Champions; (L) League Leaders' Shield Winners

== Fixtures/results ==
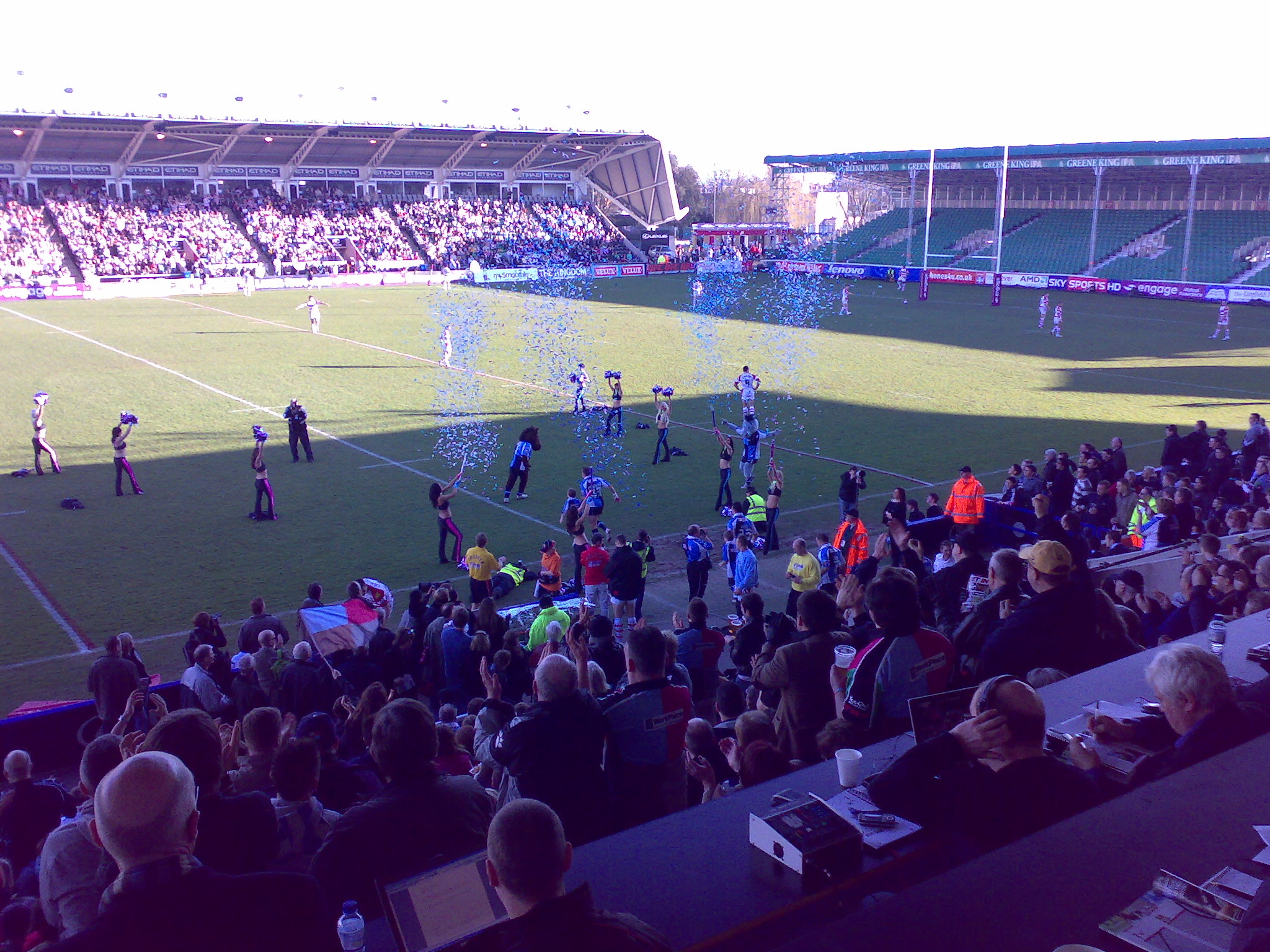
Players warming up ahead of Wigan's opening Super League tie against Harlequins RL at Twickenham Stoop

Competition	Round	Opponent	Result	Score	Home/away	Venue	Attendance	Date
Friendly	N/A	Warrington Wolves	Lose	30–22	Away	Halliwell Jones Stadium	6,573	13 Jan 2008
Friendly	N/A	Bradford Bulls	Win	16–28	Away	Grattan Stadium	5,036	20 Jan 2008
Friendly	N/A	Widnes Vikings	Win	18–42	Away	Halton Stadium	5,106	27 Jan 2008
Super League XIII	1	Harlequins RL	Win	28–47	Away	Twickenham Stoop	8,041	9 Feb 2008
Super League XIII	2	Castleford Tigers	Win	28–16	Home	JJB Stadium	16,667	15 Feb 2008
Super League XIII	3	Hull	Lose	24–22	Away	KC Stadium	13,226	22 Feb 2008
Super League XIII	4	Bradford Bulls	Win	28–14	Home	JJB Stadium	15,444	1 Mar 2008
Super League XIII	5	Warrington Wolves	Lose	32–20	Away	Halliwell Jones Stadium	13,024	8 Mar 2008
Super League XIII	6	Huddersfield Giants	Win	19–20	Away	Galpharm Stadium	8,417	16 Mar 2008
Super League XIII	7	St. Helens	Lose	46–10	Away	Knowsley Road	17,500	21 Mar 2008
Super League XIII	8	Hull Kingston Rovers	Win	18–12	Home	JJB Stadium	16,457	24 Mar 2008
Super League XIII	9	Wakefield Trinity Wildcats	Win	8–4	Home	JJB Stadium	12,933	28 Mar 2008
Super League XIII	10	Leeds Rhinos	Win	10–14	Away	Headingley Carnegie Stadium	18,769	5 Apr 2008
Super League XIII	11	Catalans Dragons	Lose	24–26	Home	JJB Stadium	13,044	11 Apr 2008
Challenge Cup	Rnd4	Pia Donkeys	Win	74–4	Home	JJB Stadium	4,423	20 Apr 2008
Super League XIII	12	Bradford Bulls	Lose	26–12	Away	Grattan Stadium	11,894	27 Apr 2008
Super League XIII	13	St Helens	Lose	57–16	Away	Millennium Stadium	32,516	4 May 2008
Challenge Cup	Rnd5	Whitehaven	Win	106–8	Home	JJB Stadium	3,814	12 May 2008
Super League XIII	14	Warrington Wolves	Win	38–14	Home	JJB Stadium	15,537	16 May 2008
Super League XIII	15	Wakefield Trinity Wildcats	Win	38–30	Away	Atlantic Solutions Stadium	6,370	25 May 2008
Challenge Cup	QF	Leeds Rhinos	Lose	23–16	Away	Headingley Carnegie Stadium	10,129	1 June 2008
Super League XIII	16	Huddersfield Giants†	Postponed	N/A	Home	JJB Stadium	N/A	6 Jun 2008
Super League XIII	17	Catalans Dragons	Lose	45–38	Away	Stade Gilbert Brutus	9,125	14 Jun 2008
Super League XIII	18	Castleford Tigers	Draw	22–22	Away	The Jungle	7,048	22 Jun 2008
Super League XIII	19	Harlequins RL	Win	38–20	Home	JJB Stadium	11,453	27 Jun 2008
Super League XIII	20	Leeds Rhinos	Win	23–22	Home	JJB Stadium	14,911	5 Jul 2008
Super League XIII	21	Hull Kingston Rovers	Lose	39–22	Away	Craven Park	8,481	13 Jul 2008
Super League XIII	22	St Helens	Lose	46–12	Home	JJB Stadium	19,958	18 Jul 2008
Super League XIII	16	Huddersfield Giants†	Lose	34–4	Home	JJB Stadium	12,216	25 Jul 2008
Super League XIII	23	Hull FC	Win	66–6	Home	JJB Stadium	12,842	1 Aug 2008
Super League XIII	24	Catalans Dragons	Draw	16–16	Away	Stade Gilbert Brutus	9,535	9 Aug 2008
Super League XIII	25	Wakefield Trinity Wildcats	Win	32–22	Home	JJB Stadium	12,319	15 Aug 2008
Super League XIII	26	Leeds Rhinos	Lose	16–52	Home	JJB Stadium	14,778	22 Aug 2008
Super League XIII	27	St. Helens	Draw	16–16	Away	Knowsley Road	14,113	5 Sep 2008
Super League XIII Playoffs	Week 1	Bradford Bulls‡	Win	30–14	Home/Neutral	The Stobart Stadium Halton	6,806	12 Sep 2008
Super League XIII Playoffs	Week 2	Catalans Dragons	Win	26–50	Away	Stade Gilbert Brutus	9,985	20 Sep 2008
Super League XIII Playoffs	Week 3	Leeds Rhinos	Lose	14–18	Away	Headingley Carnegie Stadium	13,112	26 Sep 2008

- † Wigan Warriors against Huddersfield Giants on 6 June 2008 was postponed due to resurfacing work at the JJB Stadium. The match was re-arranged for 25 July 2008.
- ‡ Match was originally due to take place at the JJB Stadium but the venue was changed due to the unavailability of the Stadium on that date.

== Statistics ==
Team Statistics

Statistic	Total
Total Tries	109
Total Points	648
Total Goals	105
Drop Goals	2
Metres	34324
Carries	5111
Tackles	7412
Offloads	316
Attacking Kicks	282
Runs From Dummy Half	744
Tackle Busts	667
Maker Tackles	857
Clean Breaks	149
Forty Twenties	1
Kicks in General Play	497
Missed Goals	31
Missed Tackles	31
Errors	270
Penalties	229
Red Cards (Sent Off)	4
Yellow Cards (Sin Binned)	4

Top 5 Appearances

Player name	Appearances
Andy Coley	36
Thomas LeuLuai	35
George Carmont	35
Pat Richards	34
Harrison Hansen	34

Top 5 Try Scores

Player name	Tries
Pat Richards	17
George Carmont	15
Harrison Hansen	14
Thomas LeuLuai	14
Joel Tomkins	12

Top 3 Goal Scorers

Player name	Goals
Pat Richards	157
Cameron Phelps	4
Sean O'Loughlin	4

== Staff ==
Management board

- President – Peter Higginbottom
- Owner and chairman – Ian Lenagan
- Chief executive – Mick Hogan

Rugby

- Performance director – Joe Lydon
- Head coach – Brian Noble
- Assistant coach – Phil Veivers
- Strength & conditioning coach – Mike Forshaw
- Reserve team coach – Shaun Wane
- Academy team coach – John Pendlebury
