= 2010 Super League Grand Final =

Wigan Warriors	St Helens
22	10
	1	2	Total
WIG	16	6	22
STH	6	4	10
- Date: 2 October 2010
- Stadium: Old Trafford
- Location: (England) Manchester
- Harry Sunderland Trophy: (New Zealand) Thomas Leuluai ( Wigan Warriors)
- Headliners: Diana Vickers
- Referee: Richard Silverwood
- Attendance: 71,526

Broadcast partners
- Broadcasters: Sky Sports
- Commentators: Eddie Hemmings; Mike Stephenson; Phil Clarke; Shaun McRae

The 2010 Super League Grand Final was the 13th official grand final and conclusive and championship-deciding game of Super League XV. Held on Saturday 2 October 2010, at Manchester's Old Trafford stadium, the match was contested by English clubs St. Helens and Wigan Warriors. The final saw Wigan, who also finished League leaders, win 22-10, taking over the crown of Super League champions from the Leeds Rhinos, who had held the title for 3 years. This was St. Helens' fifth consecutive Grand Final and their fourth consecutive Grand Final defeat, having won in 2006 and then lost three Grand Finals to Leeds between 2007 and 2009.

== Background ==
#	Team	Pld	W	D	L	PF	PA	PD	Pts
1	Wigan Warriors	27	22	0	5	922	411	+511	44
2	St. Helens	27	20	0	7	946	547	+399	40

=== Route to the Final ===
==== Wigan Warriors ====
Round	Opposition	Score
Qualifying Play-off	Leeds Rhinos (H)	27-26
Preliminary Semi-Final	Hull Kingston Rovers (H)	42-18
Qualifying Semi-Final	Leeds Rhinos (A)	26-6
Key: (H) = Home venue; (A) = Away venue; (N) = Neutral venue.

==== St Helens ====
Round	Opposition	Score
Preliminary Semi-Final	Warrington Wolves (H)	28-12
Qualifying Semi-Final	Huddersfield Giants (H)	42-22
Key: (H) = Home venue; (A) = Away venue; (N) = Neutral venue.

== Pre-match ==
Pre-match entertainment was provided by a performance from Diana Vickers. Rhydian Roberts sang Jerusalem and then a minute's silence was also observed for Terry Newton who had died the previous weekend before St Helens, wearing blue with white (as both sides' traditional colours are red and white), kicked off.

== Match details ==
Wigan's captain, Sean O'Loughlin, was the only player who also played in his team's previous grand final in 2003.

2 October 2010
18:00 UTC+1

Wigan Warriors	22 - 10	St. Helens
Tries: Martin Gleeson (2); Darrell Goulding; Sam Tomkins; Goals: Pat Richards (2); Mark Riddell	Report	Tries: Andrew Dixon; Francis Meli; Goals: Jamie Foster

Old Trafford, Manchester
Attendance: 71,526
Referee: Richard Silverwood
Player of the Match: Thomas Leuluai

Wigan Warriors		Position	St Helens	
6	(England) Sam Tomkins	Fullback	1	(England) Paul Wellens
24	Darrell Goulding	Winger	30	(England) Jamie Foster
3	(England) Martin Gleeson	Centre	3	(Australia) Matthew Gidley
4	(Samoa) George Carmont	Centre	5	(Samoa) Francis Meli
5	(Ireland) Pat Richards	Winger	24	(England) Jonny Lomax
19	(England) Paul Deacon	Stand Off	12	(England) Jon Wilkin
7	(New Zealand) Thomas Leuluai	Scrum half	34	(England) Matty Smith
8	(England) Stuart Fielden	Prop	10	(England) James Graham
15	(Ireland) Michael McIlorum	Hooker	9	(Wales) Keiron Cunningham (c)
10	(England) Andy Coley	Prop	15	(England) Bryn Hargreaves
11	(Samoa) Harrison Hansen	2nd Row	11	(New Zealand) Tony Puletua
12	(England) Joel Tomkins	2nd Row	4	(New Zealand) Sia Soliola
13	(England) Sean O'Loughlin (c)	Loose forward	13	(England) Chris Flannery
9	(Australia) Mark Riddell	Interchange	14	(England) James Roby
14	(England) Paul Prescott	Interchange	17	(England) Paul Clough
17	(New Zealand) Iafeta Paleaaesina	Interchange	22	(England) Andrew Dixon
25	(England) Liam Farrell	Interchange	25	(England) Jacob Emmitt
	(Australia) Michael Maguire	Coach		(Australia) Mick Potter

In the fourth minute Wigan were twelve metres out from St Helens' try-line when, on the fifth tackle, they passed it through the hands out to the right side where centre Martin Gleeson forced his way through the defence. The video referee awarded the try and Pat Richards' conversion attempt missed so the Cherry & Whites were in front 4-0. At the fifteen-minute mark Wigan were working the ball out of their own half when they again moved the ball out to the right where Sam Tomkins made a break and then passed back inside to Thomas Leuluai in support. Leuluai then passed to Deacon who passed for Gleeson to cross untouched, putting the ball down behind the uprights for his second try. Richards kicked the simple conversion so Wigan were in front 10-0. About three minutes later Wigan had again made their way up to within spitting distance of St Helens' try line where they passed the ball quickly out to right winger Darrell Goulding to dive over in the corner untouched. Richards' sideline conversion was successful so The Warriors now led 16-0 with little over a quarter of the match gone. In the twenty-eighth minute St Helens had managed to make their way up inside Wigan's ten-metre line where Jon Wilkin got the ball and ran back inside across the defensive line, passing to Andrew Dixon who ran untouched through a gap for a close-range try. The simple conversion was kicked by Jamie Foster so St Helens were trailing 16-6. No more points were scored in the remaining minutes so this was the half-time score.

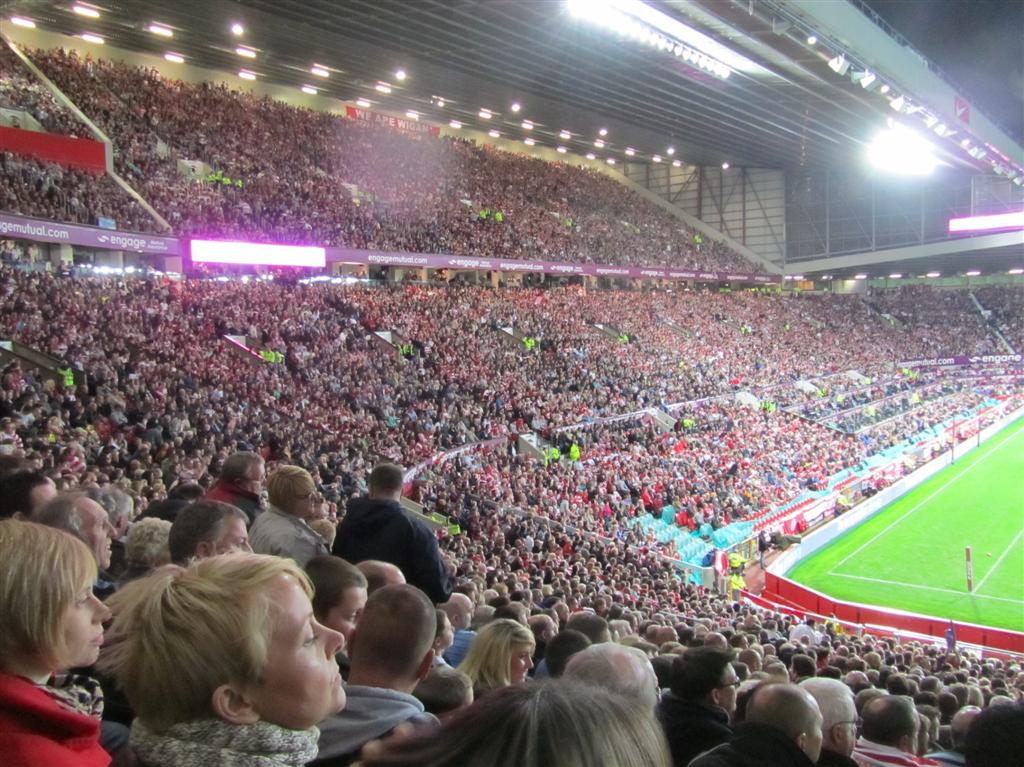
Crowds during the match

Pat Richards did not return to the field after the break due to an Achilles tendon injury. In the fourth minute of the second half, Wigan were almost over St Helens' twenty-metre line when the ball went to Leuluai who dummied his way through a gap in the defence and managed to evade several more tacklers before clambering his way to the try line where it was ruled by the video referee that the ball was stripped from him. A penalty was awarded to Wigan and the option to kick was taken, but Riddell missed. St Helens then enjoyed some possession but failed to convert their chances into points before Wigan were on the attack again by the fifty-third minute. From twelve metres out the ball was played and passed right, finding Sam Tomkins who dummied and took on the defensive line, somehow managing to maintain his momentum and reach out of a two-man tackle to plant the ball over the line. Riddell missed the conversion attempt badly so Wigan were leading 20-6. A few minutes later the Cherry & Whites got a penalty in an easy kicking position and Riddell got the two points, extending the lead to 22-6. In the sixtieth minute Wigan crossed St Helens' line again but it was called back by the video referee due to obstruction. Wigan were awarded a penalty ten minutes later and took the kick, but Tomkins' attempt missed, leaving the margin at sixteen points with ten minutes of the game remaining. In the seventy-fourth minute St Helens had made it into the opposition's quarter of the field where they swung the ball out to Francis Meli to score on the left wing. Foster missed the sideline conversion attempt, so the score was 22-10 in favour of Wigan. No more points were scored in the remaining minutes of the match so it was Wigan who celebrated their first championship since 1998.

Thomas Leuluai was awarded the Harry Sunderland Trophy as the Grand Final's man-of-the-match. Wigan's new Australian coach Michael Maguire had won a championship in his first season as a head coach. For St Helens' it was their fourth consecutive grand final defeat and a disappointing exit from the game for their retiring captain Keiron Cunningham in his 496th game.

Wigan's celebrations continued the following day with the team's open-top bus tour from JJB Sports HQ at Martland Park into Market Place, Wigan attracting thousands of fans despite rainy weather.

== 2011 World Club Challenge ==
By winning the grand final, the Wigan Warriors had earned the right to play against the 2010 NRL grand final-winners, the St. George Illawarra Dragons in the 2011 World Club Challenge in February.
