= Sean O'Loughlin =

Great Britain and England international rugby league player

Sean O'Loughlin OBE
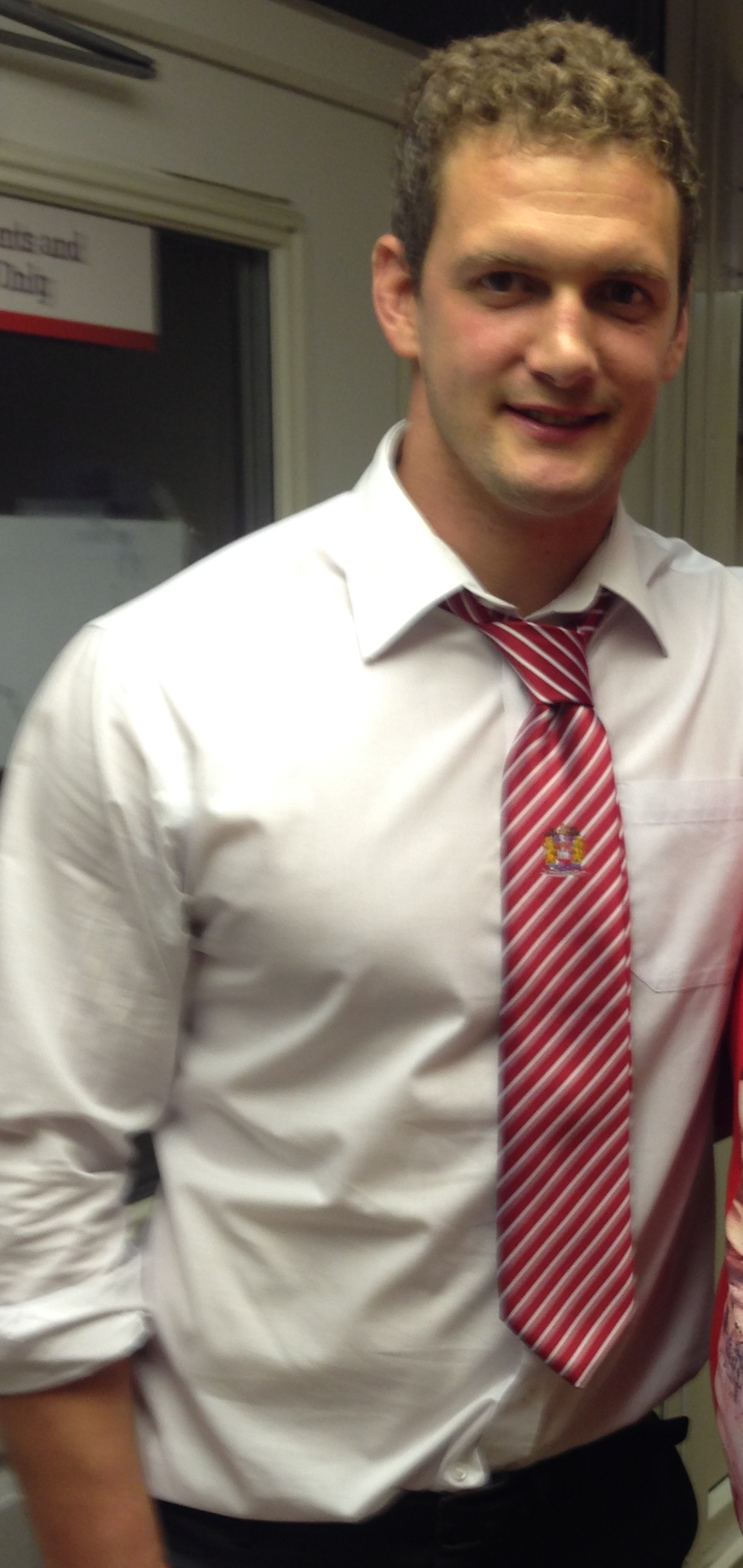

Personal information
- Full name: Sean O'Loughlin
- Born: 24 November 1982 (age 43) Wigan, Greater Manchester, England

Playing information
- Height: 6 ft 2 in (1.88 m)
- Weight: 15 st 6 lb (98 kg)
- Position: Loose forward, Stand-off
Club
Years	Team	Pld	T	G	FG	P
2002–20	Wigan Warriors	458	88	3	2	360
Representative
Years	Team	Pld	T	G	FG	P
2003	Lancashire	1	1	0	0	4
2009–18	England	25	5	0	0	20
2004–07	Great Britain	11	0	0	0	0
- Father: Keiron O'Loughlin
- Relatives: See: O'Loughlin Farrell family

Sean O'Loughlin OBE (born 24 November 1982) is an English professional rugby league coach who is an assistant coach at the Wigan Warriors in the Super League and former professional rugby league footballer.

He spent his entire playing career at Wigan, playing as a loose forward for the Super League club, which he captained. Has also played for Great Britain and England at the international level, the latter of which he has also captained.

O'Loughlin made his senior debut for Wigan in 2002 and has captained the side since 2006. He has played his entire club career with Wigan, making over 450 appearances, and winning four Grand Finals, two Challenge Cups and one World Club Challenge with the club. He has been named in the Super League Dream Team on seven occasions, including five consecutive seasons between 2010 and 2014.

O'Loughlin made his international debut in 2004 and went on to earn 11 caps for Great Britain, and an additional 25 caps for England. He was named as England captain in 2014, and has appeared for the team in two World Cups (2013 and 2017).

== Background ==
Sean O'Loughlin was born 24 November 1982 in Wigan, Greater Manchester, England.

O'Loughlin's father, Keiron, and uncle, Kevin, both played more than 250 games for Wigan in the 1970s. His father Keiron O'Loughlin also featured in the 1983–84 Challenge Cup Final for the Widnes side which achieved victory over Wigan. It was the Wigan-based amateur club Wigan St Patricks which gave Sean his first experience of competitive rugby league. He had already gained international experience as part of the 2001 Great Britain Academy of Australia, a product of the Wigan Academy, for whom he started playing in under-19s matches in 2001, and continued to do so in 2002. During his time at the academy, O'Loughlin played in a variety of positions, including a game against Wakefield Trinity in the senior academy championships where he played at Centre scoring two tries, and another against Hull Kingston Rovers where he scored a try playing at Second-row.

He is the uncle of current England rugby union player Owen Farrell, and the brother-in-law of current Ireland national rugby union coach Andy Farrell.

== Club career ==
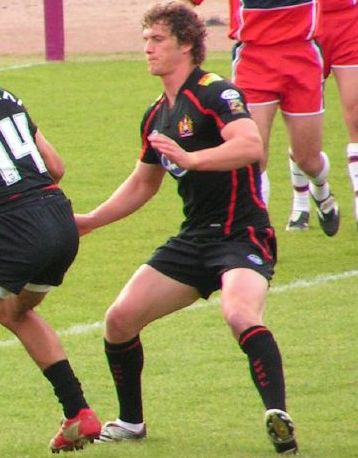
O'Loughlin playing for Wigan in 2007

O'Loughlin made his breakthrough into the Wigan first team under head coach Stuart Raper during 2002's Super League VII. His first experience in the first team came as a substitute wearing jersey No. 22 during Wigan's 18–20 home defeat by Hull F.C. Two weeks later, O'Loughlin scored his first tries for the club as a substitute against Warrington, and subsequently made six consecutive appearances from the bench. He made his first starting appearance for Wigan during a 16–41 away victory against Warrington, when he was called upon to replace his injured brother-in-law, Andy Farrell.

On that night, O'Loughlin played at loose forward, which eventually became his usual position, but during his first season he played in three positions. After returning from the Middlesex Sevens event where he played scrum-half, he made another starting appearance against Warrington, this time at stand-off. He also started, and scored a try, at centre against Leeds. O'Loughlin's first season mostly saw him come into the match as an interchange, starting in only five of the twenty-one appearances he made throughout the league season. Also in 2002 he was named as captain of the England A squad that faced New Zealand in November and later toured Fiji and Tonga. He made 3 appearances on the tour and was sent off and sin-binned in the same match against Fiji. He was named captain of the 2003 England A squad to face Australia and in the European Nations Cup. He also gained his first senior representative honour when he represented Lancashire in the 2003 Origin match.

In 2002, he featured in two matches during the Middlesex Sevens (rugby union) tournament, playing as scrum-half in a team composed of both Wigan and Orrell R.U.F.C. players.

O'Loughlin played for the Wigan Warriors as a stand-off half in the 2003 Super League Grand Final which was lost to Bradford Bulls. O'Loughlin played loose forward for most of 2004 with Andy Farrell moving to prop as cover for injuries. During the season he earned a new contract and a call up to the Great Britain squad for the first time for the 2004 Tri-Nations series. He made his début off the bench against Australia, and his first starting appearance in the following match against New Zealand.

After making an impressive start to the 2005 season, he suffered a serious knee injury in the Good Friday derby against St Helens, ruling him out for the rest of the season. He returned to the first team in 2006 and was announced as captain by coach Ian Millward. The poor start to the season left Wigan bottom of the Super League and led to the sacking of Ian Millward who was replaced by Brian Noble.

O'Loughlin showed a dramatic improvement under Noble. His performance in 2006 earned him a recall into the Great Britain squad for the mid season international with New Zealand at Knowsley Road, St. Helens which Great Britain won. Also at the end of season he was selected in the squad for the 2006 Tri-Nations in Australia, playing in Great Britain's opening defeat by New Zealand but playing an important role in Great Britain's victory over Australia. He missed Great Britain's 34–4 defeat by New Zealand with a muscle strain.

With O'Loughlin's contract expiring at the end of 2006 he was linked with a move to new Australian NRL side Gold Coast Titans for most of the season but in November 2006 he signed a new two deal with Wigan keeping him at the club until 2008. O'Loughlin was forced to rule himself out of contention for the England training squad for the 2008 Rugby League World Cup through injury. Likewise he was forced to withdraw from the 2009 Four Nations England squad before the start of the series.

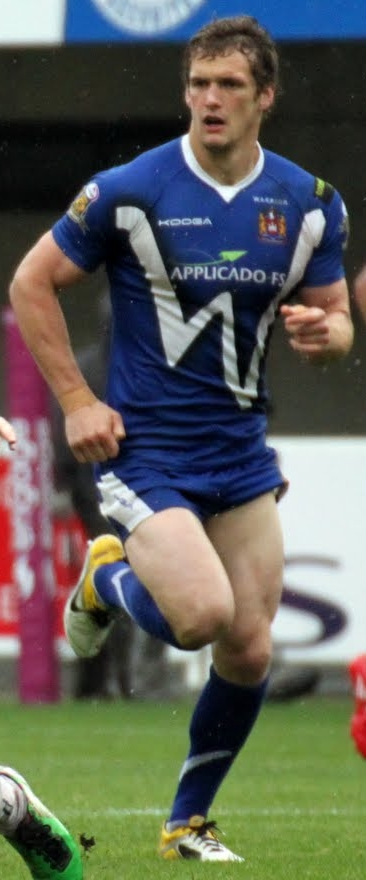
O'Loughlin playing for Wigan in 2011

The 2010 season saw O'Loughlin noted for his hard work rate, topping most if not all stats. He has been the player of the month twice in 2010 and been in the Super League dream team a record 7 times in total (up to 2018). He was selected to play for England against France in the one-off test.

He played in the 2010 Super League Grand Final victory over St. Helens at Old Trafford.

O'Loughlin captained Wigan in the 2011 Challenge Cup Final victory over Leeds Rhinos at Wembley Stadium, playing at loose forward, helping defeat Leeds 28–18.

He made his 300th appearance for Wigan in the opening game of the 2013 season against Salford. O'Loughlin led Wigan to the double, with a 16–0 Challenge Cup Final win over Hull F.C. at Wembley Stadium, and the 2013 Super League Grand Final 30–16 comeback victory over Warrington Wolves at Old Trafford.

He played in the 2014 Super League Grand Final defeat by St Helens at Old Trafford.

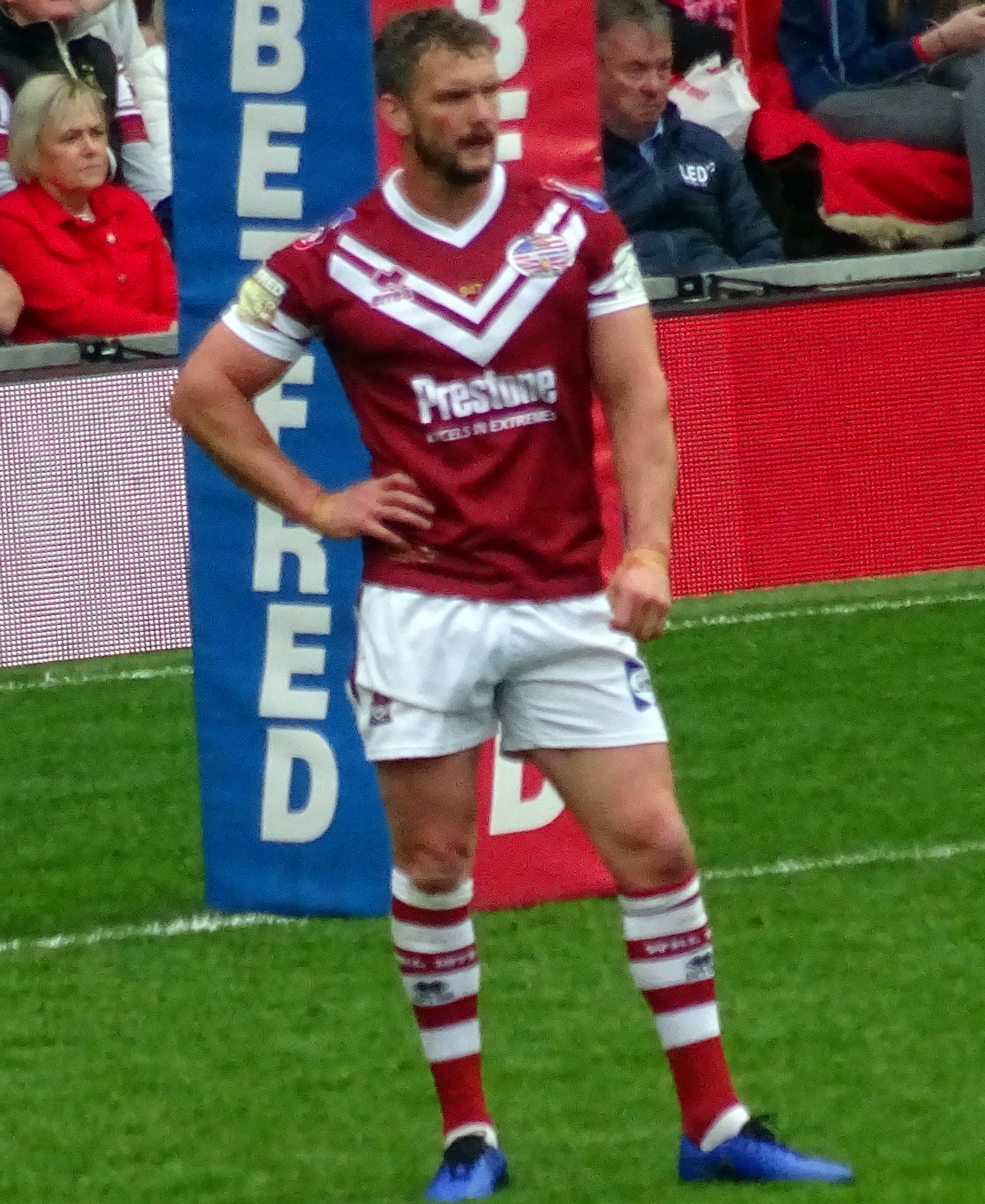
O'Loughlin playing for Wigan in 2019

He played in the 2015 Super League Grand Final defeat by Leeds Rhinos and the 2016 Super League Grand Final victory over the Warrington Wolves, both at Old Trafford.

In 2016, O'Loughlin was sent off for the first time in his career for a high tackle on Wakefield's Chris Annakin. He was subsequently given a one-match ban by the disciplinary tribunal.

He played in the 2017 Challenge Cup Final defeat by Hull F.C. at Wembley Stadium.

He played in the 2018 Super League Grand Final victory over Warrington at Old Trafford.

In November 2019, O'Loughlin signed a new one-year contract with the club, and announced that he would be retiring at the end of the 2020 season.

On 13 November 2020, O'Loughlin confirmed that he would be retiring at the end of the 2020 Super League season, bringing his 19-year career to an end.

His final game before retirement was the 2020 Super League Grand Final which Wigan lost 8–4 against St Helens.

== International career ==
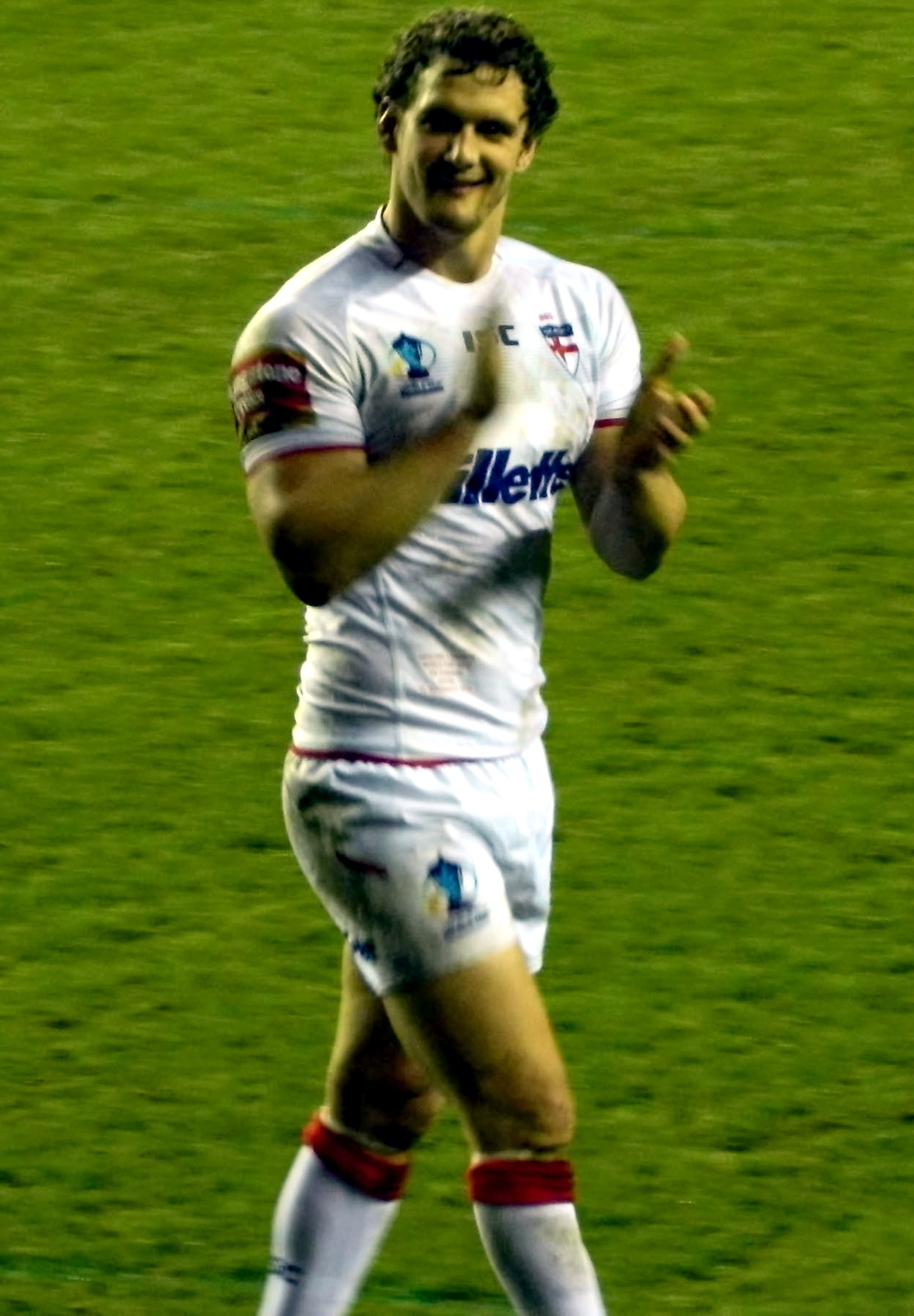
O'Loughlin playing for England in 2013

O'Loughlin played for England in the 2013 Rugby League World Cup. The following year, following the international retirement of Kevin Sinfield, he was named as England captain ahead of the Four Nations tournament.

In 2015 he was named the captain of England's squad for the end-of-year test series against New Zealand. Beforehand there was a test match where England took on France. Sean O'Loughlin was the captain of the team that went on to demolish Les Tricolores. O'Loughlin scored tries in the first match of the New Zealand test-match series in Hull and the decisive third match in Wigan. He was an influential captain throughout the series, leading his side to England's first series victory in 8 years. His influential performance also resulted him in winning the George Smith Medal as player of the series.

In October 2017 he was selected in the England squad for the 2017 Rugby League World Cup.

== Coaching career ==
Starting in the 2022 season, O'Loughlin joined newly appointed Wigan head coach Matt Peet's coaching staff as his assistant coach.

O'Loughlin was also appointed as England assistant coach in 2026 under new head coach Brian McDermott.

== Career statistics ==
Season	Team	Apps	Tries	Goals	DG	Points
2002	Wigan Warriors	21	4	0	0	16
2003	Wigan Warriors	33	7	0	0	28
2004	Wigan Warriors	36	10	0	0	40
2005	Wigan Warriors	7	0	0	2	2
2006	Wigan Warriors	29	10	0	0	40
2007	Wigan Warriors	34	7	1	0	30
2008	Wigan Warriors	17	2	1	0	10
2009	Wigan Warriors	29	5	0	0	20
2010	Wigan Warriors	31	9	0	0	36
2011	Wigan Warriors	35	9	1	0	38
2012	Wigan Warriors	27	9	0	0	36
2013	Wigan Warriors	21	1	0	0	4
2014	Wigan Warriors	23	8	0	0	32
2015	Wigan Warriors	20	2	0	0	8
2016	Wigan Warriors	19	0	0	0	0
2017	Wigan Warriors	26	3	0	0	12
2018	Wigan Warriors	20	1	0	0	4
2019	Wigan Warriors	23	1	0	0	4
2020	Wigan Warriors	7	0	0	0	0
Total		458	88	3	2	360

== Honours ==
=== Wigan ===
- Super League
  - Winners (4): 2010, 2013, 2016, 2018
- League Leaders' Shield
  - Winners (3): 2010, 2012, 2020
- Challenge Cup
  - Winners (2): 2011, 2013
- World Club Challenge
  - Winners (1): 2017

=== Individual ===
- Super League Dream Team
  - Winners (8): 2009, 2010, 2011, 2012, 2013, 2014, 2018, 2019
- Wigan Warriors Player of the Year
  - Winners (3): 2013, 2014 2017
- George Smith Medal
  - Winners (1): 2015

=== Orders ===
O'Loughlin was appointed Officer of the Order of the British Empire (OBE) in the 2022 Birthday Honours for services to rugby league football.
