= Joel Tomkins =

England dual-code international rugby footballer

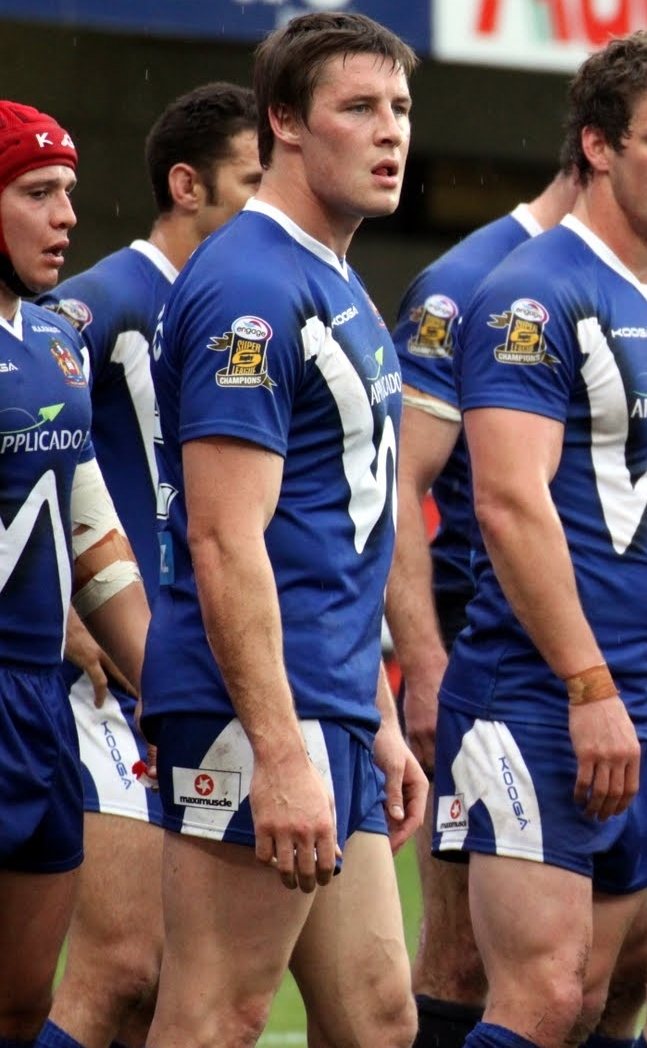

Personal information
- Full name: Joel Andrew Tomkins
- Born: 21 March 1987 (age 39) Warrington, Cheshire, England
- Height: 6 ft 3 in (1.91 m)
- Weight: 16 st 3 lb (103 kg)

Playing information

Rugby league
- Position: Second-row, Centre, Loose forward
Club
Years	Team	Pld	T	G	FG	P
2005–11	Wigan Warriors	150	49	0	0	196
2007(loan)	→ Widnes Vikings	8	2	0	0	8
2014–18	Wigan Warriors	87	16	0	0	64
2018–19	Hull Kingston Rovers	35	6	0	0	24
2020–21	Catalans Dragons	25	5	0	0	20
	Total	305	78	0	0	312
Representative
Years	Team	Pld	T	G	FG	P
2010–14	England	6	2	0	0	8

Rugby union
- Position: Centre
Club
Years	Team	Pld	T	G	FG	P
2011–14	Saracens	33	4	0	0	20
Representative
Years	Team	Pld	T	G	FG	P
2013	England Saxons	2	0	0	0	0
2013	England	3	0	0	0	0

Coaching information
Club
Years	Team	Gms	W	D	L	W%
2025–26	Catalans Dragons	25	11	0	14	44
- Relatives: Sam Tomkins (brother); Logan Tomkins (brother)

Joel Andrew Tomkins (born 21 March 1987) is an English professional rugby coach and former professional player. He was a dual-code international, having played for both the England national rugby league as a second-row forward and the rugby union team at outside centre.

After On 21 May 2025, Tomkins took over as interim coach of Super League side Catalans Dragons, following Steve McNamara. On 14 April 2026, it was announced that Tomkins had left the club due to personal reasons after just 9 months in charge. Thereafter, Tomkins signed on to be a defensive coach at Gloucester in rugby union.

== Background ==
Tomkins was born in Warrington, Cheshire, England, but he was raised in Wigan in Greater Manchester. He is the eldest brother of Sam Tomkins and Logan Tomkins, who also both played rugby league.

== Club career ==
=== Early career ===
Tomkins is a former St. John Fisher player, where he played in the Wigan Warriors' Academy at under-18's level in 2003. He was selected for the 2004 Academy Origin Series.

He primarily plays in the second-row, but he can also play as a centre, loose forward and prop.

=== Wigan Warriors (2005–11) ===
In 2005, he was called up into the first-team at the age of 18 and he made his senior début for the Wigan Warriors against the Widnes Vikings in March 2005. During 2005, he made another 12 appearances and scoring a total of 3 tries in the process. The talented youngster was given his chance at first-team level under coach Ian Millward, who had become Head Coach of the Wigan Warriors in 2005.

Tomkins started the first match of the 2006 season at loose forward, in a match against the Catalans Dragons which the Wigan Warriors lost, 38–30. He was demoted to the bench for the second match of the season against the Leeds Rhinos. After 17-minutes he was brought from off the bench and scored a try with his first touch of the ball to give the Wigan Warriors a 4–0 lead. The Wigan Warriors went onto lose the match, 16–24. In February 2006, Tomkins agreed a contract extension with the Wigan Warriors which would keep him at the club until 2008. He started from the bench for the next two matches against the Huddersfield Giants and the Salford City Reds, but he was dropped to the academy just shortly after. He later returned to the squad when he was named on the bench for the Challenge Cup fourth round match, against the Wakefield Trinity Wildcats on 2 April 2006.

He also played in the next couple of Super League matches against the Wakefield Trinity Wildcats and St. Helens, before again being dropped to the academy. Team Head Coach Ian Millward was sacked in April 2006, because of the poor results from the Wigan Warriors side. He was replaced by Brian Noble on 20 April 2006. The Wigan Warriors were bottom of the Super League and Noble decided to play a more experienced squad, which meant that Tomkins would not make another appearance during 2006.

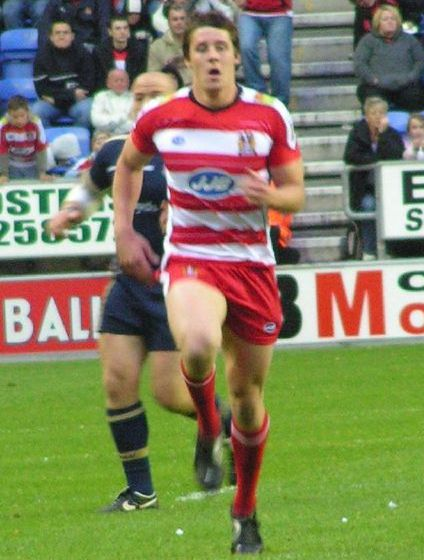
Tomkins playing for the Wigan Warriors during his first-spell at the club in 2007

Tomkins started the 2007 season in the Wigan Warriors' Senior Academy, where he was in good-form scoring 5 tries in one match against Hull Kingston Rovers' Academy. But despite this he was not called up into the first-team squad until 18 May 2007, for the Super League match against Hull Kingston Rovers. Tomkins suffered an ankle injury during the match and was out for 2-weeks, before returning to the Wigan Warriors' Senior Academy. He then later returned to the Wigan Warriors first-team for the match against the Catalans Dragons on 15 June 2007.

==== Widnes Vikings (loan) ====
On 27 July 2007, the 20-year-old joined the Widnes Vikings, initially on a month's long loan-deal, with a view to extending the deal to the end of the season.

==== Return to Wigan ====
He became a regular first-team player for the Wigan Warriors during the 2008 season, he was a substitute in the first match of the season against Harlequins RL. He was not included in the Wigan squad for the next two games against the Castleford Tigers and Hull Kingston Rovers, but he returned to the squad as a substitute for the match against the Bradford Bulls in which he scored his first try in the 2008 season.

Despite a good performance against the Bradford Bulls, he was not included in the squad for the next two Super League games, his place in the squad was taken by Australian second-row, Phil Bailey. His next appearance was in the Good Friday derby match against St. Helens as a substitute. He kept his place in the squad for 13 consecutive games and he scored two more tries, one against the Warrington Wolves in the Super League round 14 and the other against the Catalans Dragons in round 17.

Tomkins continued to be a presence in the Wigan Warriors' 2009 Super League season. He was successful in the 2010 Super League season, lifting the League Leaders' Shield with the Wigan Warriors.

Tomkins played in the 2010 Super League Grand Final victory over St. Helens at Old Trafford.

He was then part of the Wigan Warriors' side that lost the 2011 World Club Challenge to the St. George Illawarra Dragons.

Tomkins made five consecutive appearances at the start of the 2011 Super League season, including the opening fixture against St. Helens, before being sent-off in a game against Hull F.C.. He received a two-match ban for the incident with his brother Sam also banned for one-game.

Tomkins returned and scored his first try of the season in round 8, against the Leeds Rhinos.

His next tries came against Hull Kingston Rovers and the Wakefield Trinity Wildcats in rounds 10 and 12.

Tomkins played as a centre in the 2011 Challenge Cup Final victory over the Leeds Rhinos at Wembley Stadium. He scored a try after his brother Sam sent him away down the wing to score.

Tomkins fended Leeds' scrum-half Danny McGuire off and he side-stepped past Brent Webb and Carl Ablett to score under the posts, after an eighty-metre sprint.

Wigan won the game 28–18, giving Tomkins his first Challenge Cup 'Winners' Medal.'

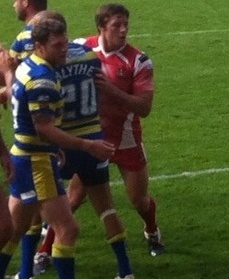
Tomkins playing for the Wigan Warriors against the Warrington Wolves in 2011

=== Saracens (2011–14) ===
At the end of the 2011 Super League season, Tomkins switched rugby codes after agreeing a £400,000 contract with Saracens, after a £250,000 release-fee was agreed with the Wigan.

Tomkins played as an outside centre in rugby union, making his debut in a LV= Cup win over Worcester Warriors in January 2012, scoring two tries. He also scored on his Heineken Cup debut against Edinburgh at Murrayfield in October 2012, and played in the semi-final defeat to RC Toulon at Twickenham the following April.

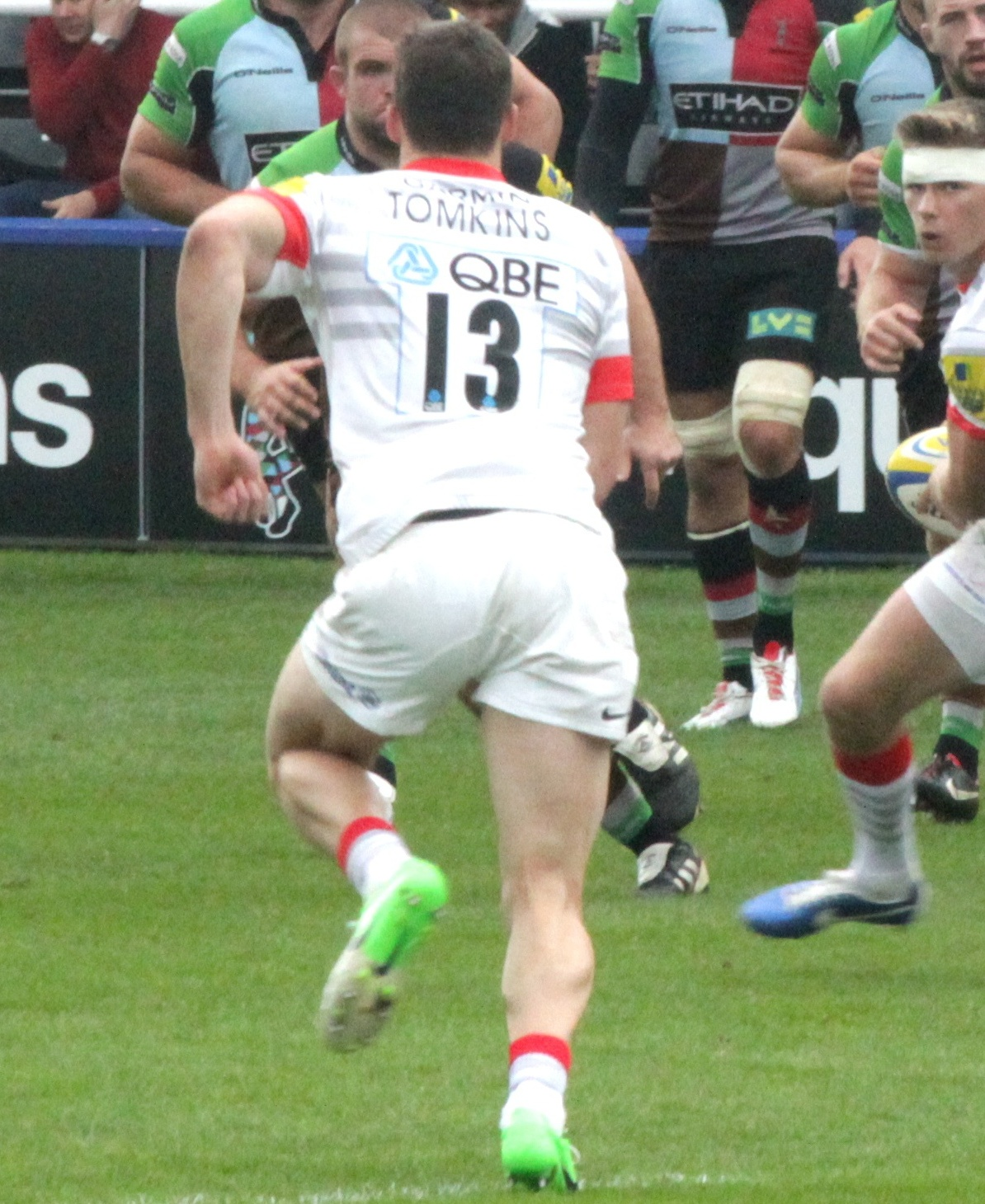
Tomkins running towards the Harlequins line in 2012

=== Return to Wigan Warriors (2014–18) ===
On 18 June 2014, the Wigan Warriors announced that they had re-signed Tomkins with immediate effect.

He played in the 2014 Super League Grand Final defeat by St Helens at Old Trafford.

He played in the 2015 Super League Grand Final defeat by the Leeds Rhinos at Old Trafford.

Tomkins was victorious in his third consecutive grand final in 2016. He also claimed victory in the 2017 World Club Challenge, against the Cronulla-Sutherland Sharks by a score of 22–6. Tomkins' final game for the Wigan Warriors came in a 23–0 Challenge Cup quarter-final defeat on 2 June 2018, by the Warrington Wolves.

On 4 June 2018, Tomkins was banned from playing for four weeks and fined £10,000, after footage posted on social media went viral of him abusing bar staff in a Wigan public house. His brother Sam was also fined £5,000 for his more limited role in the incident. Tomkins himself tendered his resignation to Wigan Warriors' rugby general manager Kris Radlinski, which was accepted by all parties involved.

=== Hull Kingston Rovers (2018–19) ===
Following his resignation from Wigan, Tomkins signed an 18-month contract to play for Hull Kingston Rovers at Craven Park until the end of the 2019 seasom, despite interest from other rival Super League clubs.

On 17 June 2018, Tomkins made his Hull KR Super League début in a 24–24 draw, against the Castleford Tigers at the Mend-A-Hose Jungle.

On 29 June 2018, Joel bagged his first try for Hull Kingston Rovers on his home début at Craven Park against the Huddersfield Giants, in a 37–10 Super League victory.

It was revealed on 24 November 2018, that Tomkins had penned a new three-year contract extension to remain at Hull Kingston Rovers until at least the end of the 2021 season.

It was revealed on 11 January 2019, that Joel was appointed as captain at Hull Kingston Rovers ahead of the start of the 2019 Super League season.

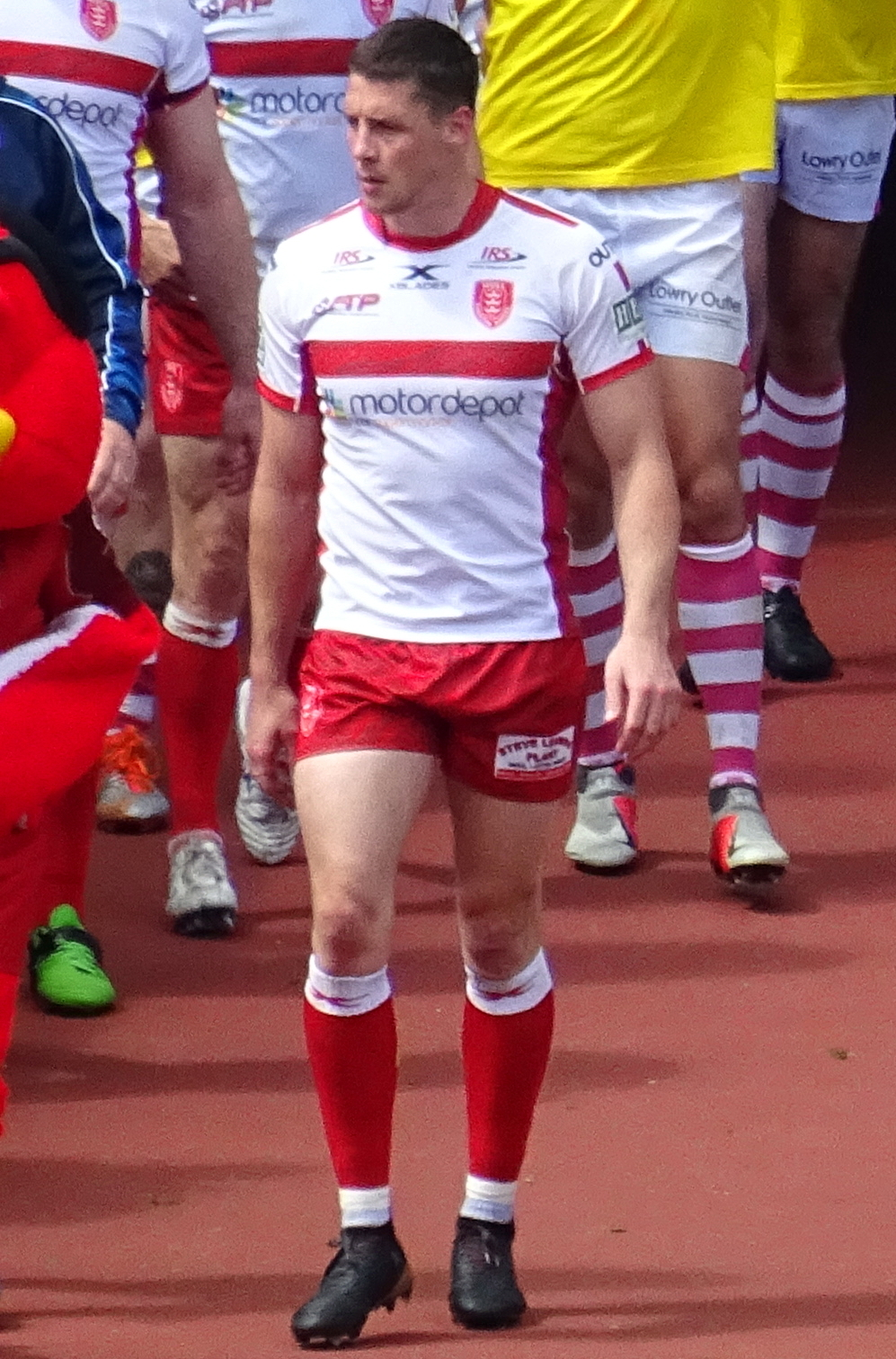
Tomkins walking out for Hull KR in 2019

In October 2019, he signed a two-year deal to join Catalans Dragons starting in 2020.

=== Catalans Dragons (2020–21) ===
During Catalans elimination final victory over Leeds in the 2020 Super League playoffs, Tomkins was placed on report after inappropriate contact with Leeds player Richie Myler.

On 18 November, Tomkins was suspended for eight matches and fined £500 after he was found guilty of inappropriate contact.

On 9 October 2021, Tomkins played for Catalans in their 2021 Super League Grand Final defeat against St. Helens.

=== Retirement ===
On 18 November 2021, Tomkins announced his retirement from professional rugby, after initially signing a contract to join Championship club Leigh Centurions for the 2022 season.

== Coaching ==
=== Catalans Dragons ===
On 21 May 2025, Tomkins was appointed as interim head-coach for Catalans Dragons in the Super League following the sudden departure of Steve McNamara, who was sacked a month later. In July, he was appointed as the permanent head coach, having his contract extended to the end of the 2027 season.

On 10 April 2026 it was reported that he had departed Catalans Dragons due to personal circumstances, with Ryan Sheridan taking temporary charge

=== Gloucester Rugby ===
On 21 April 2026, it was announced that Tomkins would take up the role of defensive coach at Gloucester RFC for the 2026-27 rugby union Premiership Rugby season

== International career ==
=== England rugby league ===
Tomkins made his senior international debut for England in 2010, a mid-season test against France. Tomkins was an interchange forward in a game notable for his brother Sam scoring four tries, and would be Joel's only international appearance against a national team on home soil. In autumn, the brothers were selected for the 2010 Rugby League Four Nations in Australia and New Zealand. Tomkins played in a pre-tournament draw against New Zealand Maori, before featuring in both losses to New Zealand and Australia.

In 2011, Tomkins was selected for England in the inaugural International Origin against a selection of non-English Super League players. Tomkins started from the bench but scored his first international try, as the home side lost 12–16. At the end of the season, Tomkins asked to be omitted from England's 2011 Rugby League Four Nations squad for personal reasons, ultimately switching codes while the tournament was in progress.

After returning from rugby union, Tomkins returned to the England squad for the 2014 Rugby League Four Nations, again in Australia and New Zealand. He started all three matches in the tournament, and scored his second international try against Samoa in the opening game at Suncorp Stadium.

=== England rugby union ===
==== England Saxons ====
In 2013, Tomkins was called up for the first of his two caps for the second-string England Saxons rugby union team.

Starting at outside centre in both tests, Tomkins enjoyed initial success against the Ireland Wolfhounds in a closely contested match, ending in a 14–10 victory for the England Saxons.

However a week later, Tomkins experienced his first taste of defeat in a union white shirt by a strong Scotland A team, who ran-out winners 9–13, in a rain-swept match set in Newcastle.

==== Senior ====
Following Tomkins' good-form for the Saracens in the 2013–2014 season and an injury to Manu Tuilagi, Tomkins was selected for the England elite player squad for the 2013 Autumn International Series.

He won his début cap in a 20–13 victory over Australia, playing the full 80 minutes to regain the Cook Cup. The following week, Tomkins again played for the duration against Argentina, before leaving the field injured with four minutes remaining against the All Blacks in his third and final appearance for England.

== Career statistics ==
=== Rugby league ===
Season	Team	Apps	Tries	Goals	DG	Points
2005	Wigan Warriors	13	3	0	0	12
2006	Wigan Warriors	7	1	0	0	4
2007	Wigan Warriors	3	0	0	0	0
2007	Widnes Vikings (loan)	8	2	0	0	8
2008	Wigan Warriors	28	11	0	0	44
2009	Wigan Warriors	33	7	0	0	28
2010	Wigan Warriors	34	17	0	0	68
2011	Wigan Warriors	32	9	0	0	36
2014	Wigan Warriors	7	2	0	0	8
2015	Wigan Warriors	32	8	0	0	24
2016	Wigan Warriors	10	1	0	0	4
2017	Wigan Warriors	22	3	0	0	12
2018	Wigan Warriors	15	3	0	0	12
2018	Hull Kingston Rovers	9	2	0	0	8
2019	Hull Kingston Rovers	13	3	0	0	12
Total		427	87	3	2	356

== Honours ==
=== Club ===
- Super League (2): 2010, 2016
- World Club Challenge (1): 2017
- League Leaders' Shield (1): 2010
- Challenge Cup (1): 2011
