= Paul Prescott =

Ireland international rugby league footballer

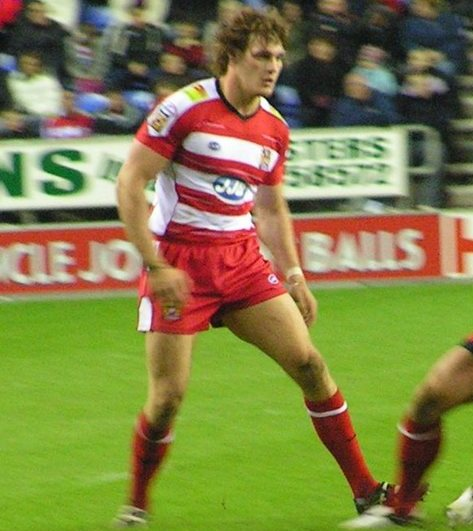

Personal information
- Born: 1 January 1986 (age 40) Stratford upon Avon, Warwickshire, England

Playing information
- Height: 6 ft 2 in (1.88 m)
- Weight: 16 st 5 lb (104 kg)
- Position: Prop
Club
| Years | Team | Pld | T | G | FG | P |
|---|---|---|---|---|---|---|
| 2004–13 | Wigan Warriors | 145 | 4 | 0 | 0 | 16 |
| 2006(loan) | → Leigh Centurions | 7 | 0 | 0 | 0 | 0 |
| | Total | 152 | 4 | 0 | 0 | 16 |
Representative
| Years | Team | Pld | T | G | FG | P |
| 2007 | Ireland | 1 | 0 | 0 | 0 | 0 |

Paul Prescott (born 1 January 1986) is a former Ireland international rugby league footballer. He played for the Wigan Warriors in the Super League.

He won the 2010 Grand Final, the 2011 Challenge Cup and 2011 and 2012 League Leaders' Shields.

He retired from the game on 4 July 2013 due to a recurring back injury.

== Background ==
Prescott was born in Stratford upon Avon, Warwickshire, England.

== Playing career ==
=== 2000s ===
Prescott played in the Wigan academy setup in 2003 and 2004. His amateur club had been Ince Rose Bridge. He was called into the first team squad in July 2004 after an injury crisis left Wigan with no fit senior prop forwards. This was Prescott’s début from the bench against Castleford. Prescott was given a 2-year full-time contract with Wigan in August 2004. He went on to make 3 appearances in 2004.

Prescott was selected for the Lancashire squad in the 2004 Academy Origin Series and was also selected for the England Academy U-18s tour to Australia but later had to withdraw.

Chairman Maurice Lindsay commented: "Bryn Hargreaves, and Paul Prescott have signed for a further two years, and as they are two of the best front row prospects in the country it gives us added satisfaction that they have all come through our Junior Development Scheme."

Prescott suffered a serious knee injury in June 2005 which kept him out of action for a year, he received treatment from specialist doctors at the National Centre for Sports Injury Surgery in Oswestry, Shropshire. He made his return in 2006 but after just four matches he was injured again in a Challenge Cup match with Wakefield Trinity when a collision with one of his team mates, Bryan Fletcher, caused a detached retina. However he did make his comeback later that year.

Prescott was loaned out to National League One side Leigh at the end of 2006 to allow Wigan to free up salary cap money and complete the signing of Bradford Bulls prop Stuart Fielden. He finished his loan in September 2006 and return to Wigan. In 2007 Prescott managed to establish himself in the Wigan side making 21 appearances scoring 1 try.

Prescott played for the Ireland national rugby league team in 2007, helping them qualify for the 2008 Rugby League World Cup.

=== 2010s ===
In 2010 Prescott helped Wigan Warriors win the League Leaders' Shield.

He played in the 2010 Super League Grand Final victory over St. Helens at Old Trafford.

He played in the 2011 Challenge Cup Final victory over the Leeds Rhinos at Wembley Stadium.

=== Retirement ===
Prescott was forced to announce early retirement from rugby league on 4 July 2013 due to a recurring back problem.

== Football ==
In 2013, Prescott joined the Premier League as Performance Systems Project Manager.
