= 2008 National League One =

National League One 2008
- League: National League One
- Duration: 18 rounds
- Teams: 10
- Broadcast partners: Sky Sports

2008 season

2008 National League One was a semi-professional rugby league football competition played in the United Kingdom, the second tier of the sport in the country. In July 2008, it was announced that Celtic Crusaders and Salford City Reds (who went on to finish as the top two in the league and contest the grand final) had been granted licenses to join the Super League in 2009. Dewsbury Rams, the bottom-placed team, were relegated to renamed Championship 1 (formerly National League 2).

== National League One ==
=== Table ===
Position	Club	Played	Won	Drawn	Lost	Pts For	Pts Agst	Pts Diff	B.P.	Points
1	Salford City Reds	18	12	3	3	614	302	312	3	45
2	Celtic Crusaders	18	12	0	6	511	391	120	4	40
3	Halifax	18	11	1	6	634	514	120	3	38
4	Leigh Centurions	18	10	0	8	448	448	0	4	34
5	Whitehaven	18	10	0	8	420	399	21	2	32
6	Widnes Vikings	18	10	2	6	453	410	43	5	30
7	Sheffield Eagles	18	8	1	9	425	530	-105	3	29
8	Featherstone Rovers	18	6	1	11	452	515	-63	6	26
9	Batley Bulldogs	18	5	0	13	387	538	-151	8	23
10	Dewsbury Rams	18	2	0	16	315	612	-297	7	13

=== Playoffs ===
Elimination play-offs
September 2008
3	Halifax	32
6	Widnes Vikings	16
September 2008
4	Leigh Centurions	24
5	Whitehaven	30

Qualifying/Elimination semifinal
September 2008
1	Salford City Reds	18
2	Celtic Crusaders	44
September 2008
Halifax	22
Whitehaven	24

Preliminary final
September 2008
Salford City Reds	62
Whitehaven	18

Grand Final
28 September 2008
Salford City Reds	36
Celtic Crusaders	18

Week One.

- Halifax (H) beat Widnes (A) (Halifax through to week two, Widnes are eliminated).
- Whitehaven (A) beat Leigh (A) (Whitehaven through to week two, Leigh are eliminated).

Week Two.

- Crusaders (A) beat Salford (H) (Crusaders through to the Grand Final in week four, Salford play in week three).
- Whitehaven (A) beat Halifax (H) (Whitehaven will play Salford in week three's semi final, Halifax are eliminated).

Week Three.

- Salford (H) beat Whitehaven (A) (Salford are through to the Grand Final in week four, Whitehaven are eliminated).

Week 4.

- Salford City Reds 36 - 18 Celtic Crusaders. Match played at neutral venue Halliwell Jones Stadium.

Salford City Reds were the 2008 League One champions.
