= Iafeta Paleaaesina =

New Zealand international rugby league footballer

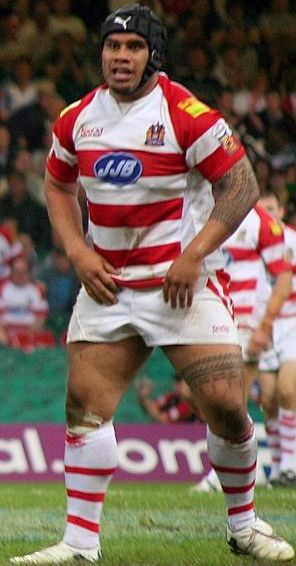

Personal information
- Full name: Iafeta Iakopo Paleaaesina
- Born: 10 February 1983 (age 43) Auckland, New Zealand

Playing information
- Height: 187 cm (6 ft 2 in)
- Weight: 110 kg (17 st 5 lb)
- Position: Prop
Club
Years	Team	Pld	T	G	FG	P
2001–05	New Zealand Warriors	83	8	0	0	32
2006–10	Wigan Warriors	145	21	0	0	84
2011–12	Salford City Reds	45	5	0	0	20
2013	Limoux Grizzlies	15	4	0	0	16
2014–16	Hull F.C.	49	1	0	0	4
2015(loan)	→ Doncaster	2	1	0	0	4
2016(loan)	→ Doncaster	11	3	0	0	12
2017	Doncaster	17	6	0	0	24
	Total	367	49	0	0	196
Representative
Years	Team	Pld	T	G	FG	P
2005–06	New Zealand	3	2	0	0	0

Iafeta Iakopo "Feka" Paleaaesina (born 10 February 1983) is a New Zealand former rugby league footballer. He played as a prop for the New Zealand Warriors in the NRL, and for the Wigan Warriors, Salford City Reds and Hull F.C. in the Super League.

== Background ==
Paleaaesina was born in Auckland, New Zealand, and is of Samoan descent.

He was educated at Penrose High School (now One Tree Hill College) in Auckland.

== Career ==
=== New Zealand ===
He started playing rugby league at the age of nine with New Zealand club Otahuhu Leopards.

He made his National Rugby League (NRL) début with the New Zealand Warriors against Northern Eagles in June 2001, and went on to become one of the club's most effective performers. Before his NRL debut, he had previously played for Papatoetoe in the Auckland competition, and Hibiscus Coast Raiders in the Bartercard Cup.

Paleaaesina played for the Junior Kiwis in 2001, and the Kiwis in 2005.

=== Wigan Warriors ===
In June 2005 he signed a three-year deal to play for Wigan Warriors, starting in 2006. Recently arrived Wigan Warriors coach Ian Millward commented: "This is a great signing for us. He will add size and pace to our pack for next year and he is only 22 years of age." Paleaaesina said: "It's a great thrill to be joining Wigan and my good friend Jerry Seu Seu. I had several offers but Wigan is still the biggest name down here and it will be a thrill to play for them."

Iafeta Paleaaesina impressed on his league début for the Wigan Warriors scoring a try in the opening 2006 Super League XI match against the Catalans Dragons. Paleaaesina also scored again in Wigan Warriors' 36–20 victory over the Huddersfield Giants on 24 February 2006.

He was one of the best players for Wigan Warriors in the 2006 Super League season despite damaging his calf muscle in a game against the Warrington Wolves. His return from injury was against the Huddersfield Giants on 22 April 2006 which Wigan Warriors won 46–14. Iafeta Paleaaesina played a key role in Wigan Warriors: 2007 squad making a noticeable impact to their performances.

Although his surname is often written with an apostrophe in the middle (between the 2 letter "a"s), this is incorrect. When the player first arrived at Wigan Warriors, he was handed his playing shirt with his name on it, and he returned it, stating that the spelling was incorrect. A new one was produced, minus the apostrophe, which he was happy with.

On 4 October 2007 the RLIF gave permission for Paleaaesina to represent Samoa at the 2008 Rugby League World Cup rather than New Zealand who he had previously represented in international matches. He qualified to play for Samoa due to his Samoan heritage.

He played in the 2010 Super League Grand Final victory over St. Helens at Old Trafford.

=== Later career ===
In 2014, Paleaaesina signed to play for Hull F.C. in the Super League.

In 2016, Paleaaesina played for Doncaster as a dual registration player before joining the club on a permanent basis at the end of the season.

In September 2017, Paleaaesina announced he would be retiring at the end of the season.
