= David Vaealiki =

NZ international rugby league footballer

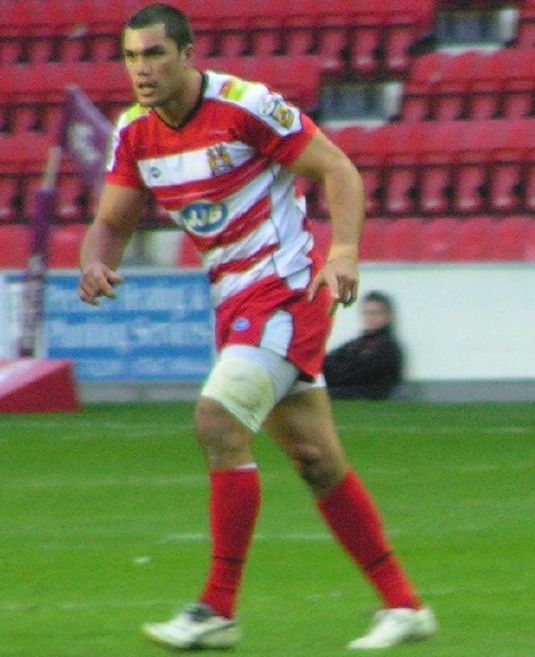
- Vaealiki playing for Wigan in 2007

Personal information
- Full name: David Ioane Vaealiki
- Born: 13 November 1980 (age 45) Christchurch, New Zealand
- Height: 188 cm (6 ft 2 in)
- Weight: 99 kg (15 st 8 lb)

Playing information

Rugby league
- Position: Fullback, Centre
Club
Years	Team	Pld	T	G	FG	P
1999–04	Parramatta Eels	92	32	0	0	128
2005–07	Wigan Warriors	73	17	1	0	70
2008	Manly Sea Eagles	2	0	0	0	0
	Total	167	49	1	0	198
Representative
Years	Team	Pld	T	G	FG	P
1998	Canterbury
2000–03	New Zealand	7	3	0	0	12

Rugby union
- Position: Centre
Club
Years	Team	Pld	T	G	FG	P
2008–10	SC Albi	19	2	0	0	10

David Ioane Vaealiki (/veɪəlɪki/) (born 13 November 1980) is a New Zealand former rugby league and rugby union footballer who most recently played for SC Albi. He has represented New Zealand in rugby league and previously played in the National Rugby League in Australia and in the Super League, primarily as a centre.

== Early years and Parramatta ==
A product of New Zealand junior side Sydenham, David Vaealiki attended Linwood High School and became Canterbury's youngest ever representative when he made his début for the province aged just 17 years and 199 days in a match against the West Coast. He then signed for the Parramatta Eels and made his first grade début in 1999 against Canberra. He scored his first try for the club in their 68-10 victory Western Suburbs in round 20. Vaealiki played six games for Parramatta in his debut season including the clubs preliminary final loss to Melbourne. During this time he taught Physical Education at Castle Hill High School, where the league team he coached had 0 wins. He went on to play for Parramatta at centre in their shock 2001 NRL Grand Final loss to the Newcastle Knights. Vaealiki scored the fastest hat-trick in NRL history against Penrith on 17 March 2002. In 2004, his season was cut short by an Achilles tendon injury, he played only eight games.

== Wigan Warriors career ==
He signed a three-year contract with the Wigan Warriors in July 2004. He joined the club for the 2005 Super League and his first appearance for Wigan Warriors on 30 January 2005 in a pre-season friendly against the London Broncos after starting the match from the bench. He made his first start for the Wigan Warriors in their 15–4 win over the Salford City Reds in the Super League his last game was the semi-final against the Leeds Rhinos during October 2007.

== Manly-Warringah Sea Eagles ==
David Vaealiki was expected to join the Harlequins RL when his Wigan Warriors contract expired at the end of 2007's Super League XII and it was not known if he was offered a new contract. During September 2007 he was linked with a move to French rugby union side Sporting Club Albigeois.

Instead Vaealiki joined the Manly-Warringah Sea Eagles on a one-year deal and played two games for the club in early 2008.

== French rugby union ==
Vaealiki was released by Manly after round 7 of the NRL to enable him to take up the offer of a two-year contract with Top 14 French rugby union club, SC Albi.

== International career ==
Vaealiki earned international selection for the Junior Kiwis in 1998 and played for New Zealand between 2000 and 2003, including the World Cup in 2000.
