= Scott Logan (rugby league) =

Scotland international rugby league footballer

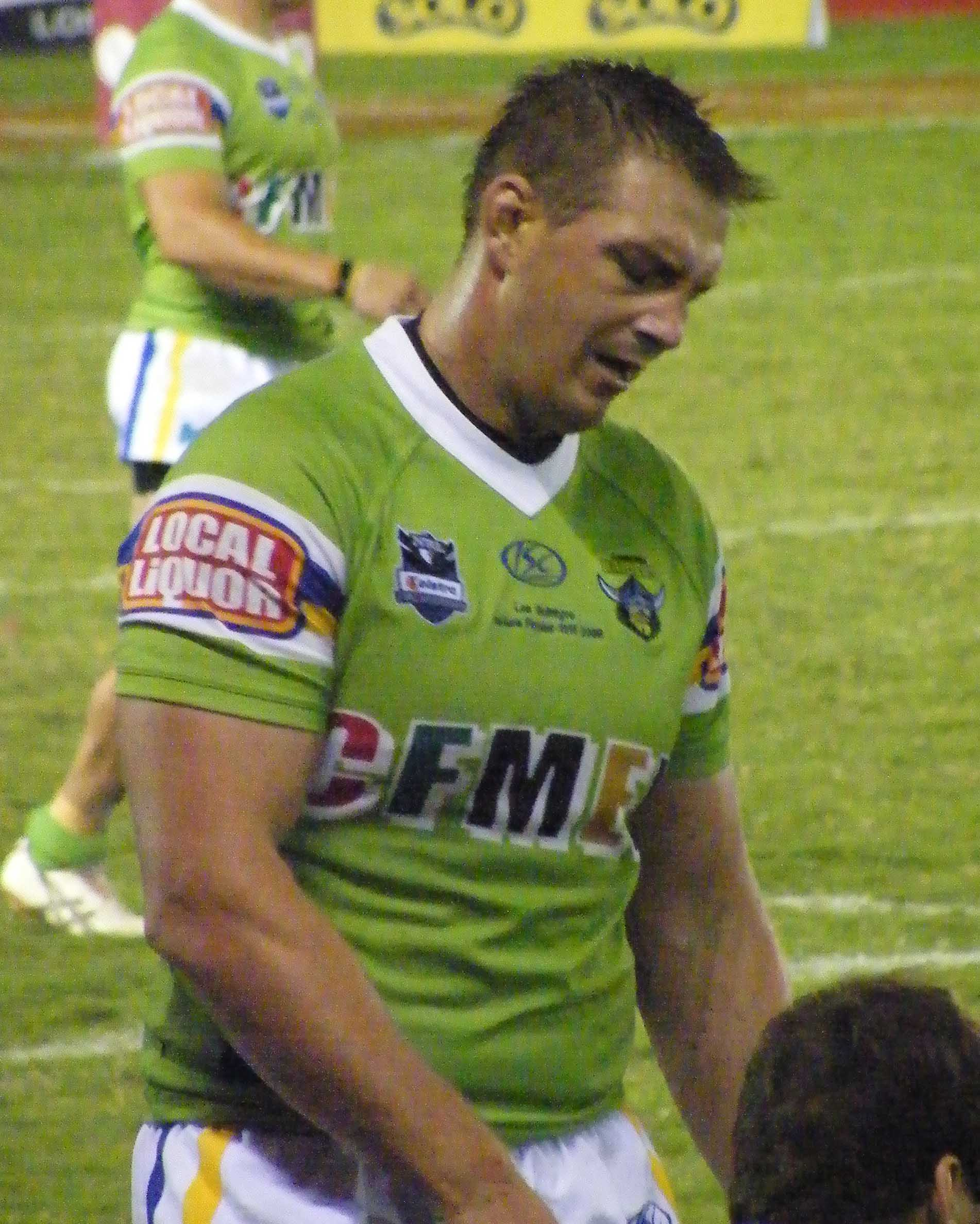
- Logan playing for Canberra in 2009

Personal information
- Full name: Scott Logan
- Born: 22 June 1976 (age 50) Wollongong, New South Wales, Australia

Playing information
- Height: 192 cm (6 ft 3 in)
- Weight: 110 kg (17 st 5 lb)
- Position: Prop
Club
Years	Team	Pld	T	G	FG	P
1996–01	Sydney Roosters	78	2	0	0	8
2002–05	Hull FC	50	5	0	0	20
2004–05	South Sydney	22	1	0	0	4
2006	Wigan Warriors	22	0	0	0	0
2007–10	Canberra Raiders	74	7	0	0	28
	Total	246	15	0	0	60
Representative
Years	Team	Pld	T	G	FG	P
2000–08	Scotland	6	0	0	0	0

Scott Logan (born 22 June 1976) is a former Scotland international rugby league footballer who last played as a prop for the Canberra Raiders in the NRL. He has been described as, "one of the most durable props of the modern era."

Logan coached the Illawarra Cutters in the NSW Cup competition.

== Background ==
Logan was born in Wollongong, New South Wales, Australia.

== Playing career ==
Logan started his football career at Brisbane Easts junior club, before making his first-team début 1996 for the Sydney City Roosters against North Queensland. He played with the Sydney Roosters for six years.

In 2000, Logan made his international début by representing Scotland in the World Cup. He stayed at the Sydney Roosters until 2001 when he signed a contract with Super League side Hull F.C.. He spent three years at Hull F.C. but he suffered a series of injuries one being a badly broken ankle which took him almost a year to recover from.

In 2004, he returned to Australia to play for the NRL side the South Sydney Rabbitohs for two years before agreeing a two-year deal with the Super League side the Wigan Warriors.

Logan played just one season with the Wigan Warriors in 2006 as he was one of a number of players released by Wigan at the end of the 2006 season; he signed a contract with Canberra Raiders for 2007. Following a very strong two seasons with the Raiders, being named the club's player of the year in 2007, Logan earned a contract extension, which will take to the end of 2009.

Logan was named in the Scotland squad for the 2008 Rugby League World Cup. He was the only player remaining from the 2000 World Cup.
