= 2007 Super League season =

British rugby league season

Super League XII
- League: Super League
- Duration: 27 Rounds
- Teams: 12
- Highest attendance: 24,028; Wigan Warriors vs St Helens (6 April)
- Lowest attendance: 2,347; Harlequins vs Salford City Reds (8 Sept)
- Total attendance: 1,537,326 ▲ (average 9,855)
- Broadcast partners: Sky Sports

2007 Season
- Champions: Leeds Rhinos; 2nd Super League title 5th British title
- League Leaders: St. Helens
- Man of Steel: (England) James Roby
- Top point-scorer: (Republic of Ireland) Pat Richards (248)
- Top try-scorer: (Samoa) Henry Fa'afili (21)

Promotion and relegation
- Promoted from National League One: Castleford Tigers
- Relegated to National League One: Salford City Reds

Engage Super League XII is the official name for the year 2007's Super League season in the sport of rugby league.

The 2007 season kicked off on the weekend of 2 February 2007 at the Galpharm Stadium. For the first time, the league had a staggered start due to the World Club Challenge between St. Helens and Brisbane Broncos. The first round of matches began on the weekend of 9 to 11 February 2007.

The opening round attendance of 21,693 between Wigan and Warrington at the DW Stadium was the biggest opening round Super League attendance to date, and would remain the biggest until Wigan v Leigh in 2025.

St. Helens were defending Super League champions and Challenge Cup holders. Hull Kingston Rovers played in the Super League for the first time ever after being promoted from National League 1 in 2006. This season also included the first Millennium Magic weekend, which took place on the weekend of 5 and 6 May 2007 in Cardiff.

Super League XII featured 12 teams and had 27 rounds including the Millennium Magic round. St Helens, Leeds Rhinos, Bradford Bulls, Hull FC, Huddersfield Giants and the Wigan Warriors qualified for the end of season play-offs and the Salford City Reds were relegated to National League One.

The first weekend of the play-offs saw both Bradford Bulls and Huddersfield Giants defeated narrowly by both Wigan Warriors and Hull F.C. respectively. The second weekend of the play-offs saw St. Helens defeat Leeds Rhinos and get an instant passageway into the grand final whilst Wigan Warriors overcame Hull F.C. at the KC Stadium to set up a semi final encounter with Leeds Rhinos. The semi final saw Leeds Rhinos easily dispose of a tired Wigan Warriors side that had come from sixth and saw Leeds Rhinos enter the grand final against St. Helens in which they won convincingly to lift the Super League trophy for 2007.

== Teams ==
Super League XII
Team	Stadium	City/Area
Bradford Bulls	Grattan Stadium, Odsal	Bradford
Catalans Dragons	Stade Gilbert Brutus	Perpignan, France
Harlequins RL	Twickenham Stoop	Twickenham, London
Huddersfield Giants	Galpharm Stadium	Huddersfield
Hull F.C.	KC Stadium	Kingston upon Hull
Hull Kingston Rovers	New Craven Park	Kingston upon Hull
Leeds Rhinos	Headingley Carnegie Stadium	Leeds
Salford City Reds (Relegated)	The Willows	Salford
St. Helens (Reigning Champions)	Knowsley Road	St. Helens
Wakefield Trinity Wildcats	Atlantic Solutions Stadium	Wakefield
Warrington Wolves	Halliwell Jones Stadium	Warrington
Wigan Warriors	JJB Stadium	Wigan

== Season summary ==
- 4 February – Super League XI champions St. Helens open the new season with an 18–10 win at Huddersfield Giants
- 9 February – The first big shock of the season as Harlequins RL win 14–6 against St. Helens at Knowsley Road
- 10 February – Promoted Hull Kingston Rovers win their first Super League match at Craven Park, 14–9 against Wakefield Trinity Wildcats.
- 18 February – St. Helens' stuttering start continues, losing 29–22 at Wakefield Trinity Wildcats.
- 2 March – Hull Kingston Rovers continue their fantastic start with a 26–16 win at Wigan Warriors.
- 3 March – Salford City Reds earn the first shut-out of the season, beating Catalans Dragons 10–0 at The Willows.
- 5 May – The Millennium Magic weekend begins in Cardiff. Paul Cooke plays his first game for Hull Kingston Rovers against his previous club, local rivals Hull F.C., Rovers win 14–10. Meanwhile, St. Helens beat local rivals Wigan Warriors 34–18 and Catalans Dragons lose 28 – 32 to Harlequins RL.
- 6 May – Millennium Magic concludes in Cardiff. Huddersfield Giants continue their fine run of form with a 36–12 win over Wakefield Trinity Wildcats and Warrington Wolves thrash Salford City Reds 50–18. In a dramatic final match, Leeds Rhinos beat Bradford Bulls in a West Yorkshire derby 42–38. The game sees 13 tries, including a Brent Webb hat-trick, but Leeds win in controversial circumstances. Trailing 38–36, they are awarded a disputed penalty by referee Steve Ganson. Kevin Sinfield kicks from long range for a draw but hits the cross-bar. Jordan Tansey, however, runs on to the loose ball and scores a try to win the game. However, video replays show Tansey is offside at the kick. In the aftermath, video ref Ashley Klein admits it was he who advised Ganson to award the initial penalty. A 58,831 aggregate crowd saw the event at the Millennium Stadium. Super League clubs agreed to repeat the event during the following season with Nigel Wood, the RFL's chief operating officer, saying: "The clubs and fans thoroughly enjoyed the day and our aim is to make next year's event even bigger and better."
- 3 June – Hull Kingston Rovers' Makali Aizue is given the first red card of the season at Belle Vue. Wakefield Trinity Wildcats overturn a 9–2 half-time deficit to win 30–15 win with the extra man.
- 15 June – The first ever Super League match without a try sees Salford City Reds beat Harlequins RL 5–2 at The Willows. It is also the lowest scoring match in Super League history.
- 17 June – Kiwi wing Lesley Vainikolo plays his last match for Bradford Bulls at Osdal. Hooker Terry Newton steals the headlines with four tries in a 34–8 win over Hull FC, but Vainikolo says goodbye by taking the conversion after Paul Deacon's try at the end of the match. It is the first time he has ever attempted a kick at goal in his life but nevertheless he gets the two points.
- 29 June – Lesley Vainikolo scores his final try for Bradford Bulls in a 38–14 derby win at Leeds Rhinos.
- 1 July – Severe flooding causes the match between Hull F.C. and Salford City Reds at the KC Stadium to be postponed. Meanwhile, Wakefield Trinity Wildcats earn a striking 32–6 win against Wigan Warriors to aid their push for a playoff place.
- 6 July – The relegation struggle looks like being a straight fight between Salford City Reds and Hull Kingston Rovers. Salford City Reds lose 35–18 at home to Wakefield Trinity Wildcats.
- 8 July – Hull Kingston Rovers are still in trouble as they lose the Hull derby at home to Hull F.C. 20–30.
- 20 July – Wakefield Trinity Wildcats earn a shock 23–16 win at Headingley Stadium against Leeds Rhinos to boost their bid for the playoffs.
- 21 July – Salford City Reds shock Bradford Bulls 14–10 at The Willows to aid their struggle against relegation.
- 3 August – The big relegation four-pointer ends Salford City Reds 24–30 Hull Kingston Rovers. Salford are now three points adrift of Rovers at the bottom with just five matches left.
- 4 August – Following their four-point penalty for breaching the salary cap, Wigan Warriors lose 43–24 at Warrington Wolves; there is now a strong chance Wigan will not reach the playoffs for the third season in a row. Huddersfield Giants beat Catalans Dragons 42–22 at the Galpharm Stadium to boost their chances, with Wakefield Trinity Wildcats and Harlequins RL losing to Bradford Bulls and Leeds Rhinos respectively.
- 11 August – A boost for Leeds Rhinos and Bradford Bulls as St. Helens suffer a surprise loss, 21–0, at Catalans Dragons in a dress rehearsal for the Challenge Cup final on 25 August.
- 12 August – In two crucial matches in the chase for playoff places, Wakefield Trinity Wildcats beat Harlequins 28–14 at Belle Vue while Hull F.C. thrash Warrington Wolves 46–14. Huddersfield Giants drop out of the top six.
- 2 September – Salford City Reds are assured of relegation when Hull Kingston Rovers thrash crosstown rivals Hull F.C. 42–6.
- 7 September – St. Helens Finished top of Super League for the third successive year running.
- 9 September – Huddersfield Giants secure their first ever play-off place with a 24–22 win over neighbours Wakefield
- 21 September – Wigan Warriors sensationally come from 30–6 down with 25 minutes to go to win 31–30 thanks to a hat-trick from winger Mark Calderwood and a drop goal from Pat Richards.
- 13 October – Leeds Rhinos win the super league grand final for the second time

== Table ==
Pos	Team	Pld	W	D	L	PF	PA	PD	Pts	Qualification
1	St Helens (L)	27	19	0	8	783	422	+361	38	Semifinal
2	Leeds Rhinos (C)	27	18	1	8	747	487	+260	37	Semifinal
3	Bradford Bulls	27	17	1	9	778	560	+218	33 (Note: Bradford deducted 2 points for salary cap breaches.)	Elimination semifinal
4	Hull F.C.	27	14	2	11	573	553	+20	30	Elimination semifinal
5	Huddersfield Giants	27	13	1	13	638	543	+95	27	Elimination semifinal
6	Wigan Warriors	27	15	1	11	621	527	+94	27 (Note: Wigan deducted 4 points for salary cap breaches.)	Elimination semifinal
7	Warrington Wolves	27	13	0	14	693	736	−43	26	
8	Wakefield Trinity Wildcats	27	11	1	15	596	714	−118	23	
9	Harlequins	27	10	3	14	495	636	−141	23	
10	Catalans Dragons	27	10	1	16	570	685	−115	21	
11	Hull Kingston Rovers	27	10	0	17	491	723	−232	20	
12	Salford City Reds (R)	27	6	1	20	475	874	−399	13	Relegation to National League One

Source: Rugby League Project
Rules for classification: 1) Points; 2) Points difference; 3) Number of points scored;
(C) Champions; (L) League Leaders' Shield Winners; (R) Relegated

== Play-offs ==
Elimination play-offs
3	Bradford Bulls	30
6	Wigan Warriors	31
4	Hull F.C.	22
5	Huddersfield Giants	16

Qualifying / Elimination semifinal
1	St. Helens	10
2	Leeds Rhinos	8
Hull F.C.	18
Wigan Warriors	21

Elimination final
Leeds Rhinos	36
Wigan Warriors	6

Grand Final
13 October 2007
St. Helens	6
Leeds Rhinos	33

== Media ==
=== Television ===
In Super League XII for the first time all live matches were broadcast in High Definition with Dolby 5.1 sound on Sky Sports HD.

== 2007 Dream Team ==
Number	Nationality	Player	Position	2007 Club
1	(Australia)	Clint Greenshields	Full back	Catalans Dragons
2	(England)	Kevin Penny	Winger	Warrington
3	(Australia)	Adam Mogg	Centre	Catalans Dragons
4	(Australia)	Jason Demetriou	Centre	Wakefield Trinity Wildcats
5	(Australia)	Scott Donald	Winger	Leeds Rhinos
6	(Australia)	Trent Barrett	Stand off	Wigan Warriors
7	(England)	Rob Burrow	Scrum half	Leeds Rhinos
8	(England)	Nick Fozzard	Prop	St. Helens
9	(England)	James Roby	Hooker	St. Helens
10	(England)	Jamie Peacock	Prop	Leeds Rhinos
11	(England)	Gareth Ellis	Second row	Leeds Rhinos
12	(Australia)	Glenn Morrison	Second row	Bradford Bulls
13	(England)	Stephen Wild	Loose forward	Huddersfield Giants
