= Bryn Hargreaves =

English rugby league player

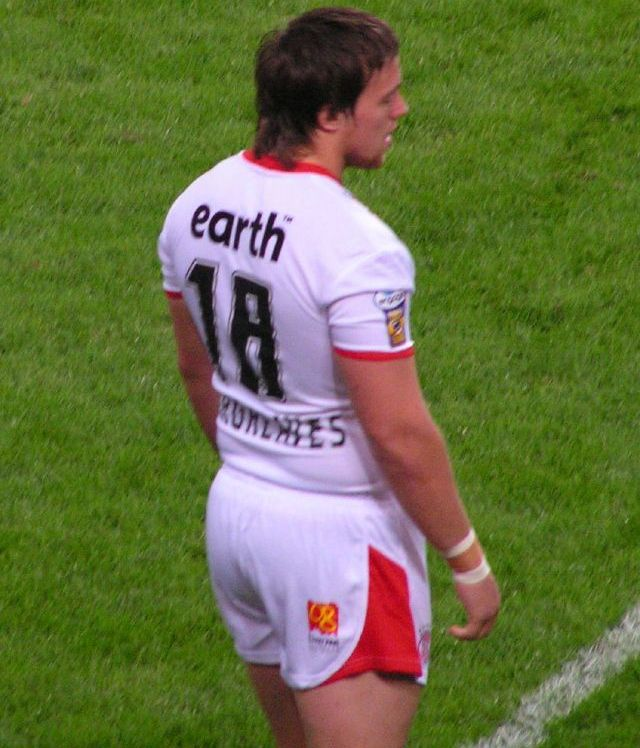

Personal information
- Full name: Bryn Jack Hargreaves
- Born: 14 November 1985; Wigan, Greater Manchester, England
- Died: 2022/2023 (aged 36–37); West Virginia, U.S.

Playing information
- Height: 6 ft 0 in (1.83 m)
- Weight: 16 st 7 lb (105 kg)
- Position: Prop
Club
Years	Team	Pld	T	G	FG	P
2004–06	Wigan Warriors	33	1	0	0	4
2006(loan)	→ Leigh Centurions	10	1	0	0	4
2007–10	St Helens	115	8	0	0	32
2011–12	Bradford Bulls	54	1	0	0	4
	Total	212	11	0	0	44

Bryn Hargreaves (14 November 1985 – 2022/2023) (Note: there is no exact date as to when he died) was an English professional rugby league footballer. He started his professional career at Wigan Warriors in 2004. After a spell on loan at Leigh Centurions, he went on to play for St Helens and Bradford Bulls before announcing his early retirement from the sport in 2012.

== Career ==
=== Wigan Warriors ===
Hargreaves played prop in the Wigan Academy from 2002. He made his first team début from the subs' bench against Salford City Reds in July 2004 and his full début against Harlequins RL in August of that year. Hargreaves was given a two-year full-time contract with the Wigan Warriors in August 2004. Hargreaves capped the 2004 season by being awarded the Under-21s Billie Joe Edwards and Craig Johnson Memorial Player of the Year trophy.

Hargreaves was selected to play for Lancashire in the 2004 Academy Origin Series and in the England Under 18s squad that toured Australia in 2004, but was requested to stay at home to aid Wigan's injury crisis. He really impressed in the first team in 2005 when injuries to more experienced players provided an opportunity for the 20-year-old to establish himself within the first team squad. Hargreaves was notably the only prop not to concede a penalty under Ian Millward's tenure.

=== Leigh Centurions (loan) ===
In July 2006, Hargreaves moved to Leigh for an initial month's loan so that Wigan could complete the signing of Stuart Fielden. Commenting on the loan, Wigan chairman Maurice Lindsay said, "Bryn is a fine player and I'm sure his time will come in the future. He is not in our first team at the moment although he did a fine job earlier in the year. We have allowed him to go to Leigh to get further experience and we wish him good luck."

Hargreaves stayed on loan until the season's close and did not return to Wigan, but instead was released from his contract with Wigan Warriors in 2006 as a part of Brian Noble's squad rebuilding for the 2007 season. At this time many clubs such as Leigh Centurions, Hull Kingston Rovers, Salford City Reds and Harlequins RL all expressed an interest in signing the promising young front rower.

=== St Helens ===
In November 2006, St. Helens, the then Super League and Challenge Cup champions, signed the ex-Wigan prop Hargreaves on a two-year deal. On Hargreaves, coach Daniel Anderson stated: “Bryn will be our fifth specialist prop next year and we are confident that we can develop him physically and technically over the next couple of years. “He was possibly thrown in at the deep end at too young an age as a starting prop at Wigan Warriors, but we believe that he has genuine potential as a rotational squad member who can be patiently and methodically developed.”

As 2006 Super League champions, St Helens faced 2006 National Rugby League Premiers the Brisbane Broncos in the 2007 World Club Challenge. Hargreaves played from the interchange bench in Saints' 18–14 victory. He was then picked for the Wales World Cup Qualifier against Scotland for whom he qualified through his grandfather's nationality. Hargreaves scored his first tries for St Helens on 13 June 2008, where he scored a hat-trick. Hargreaves played in the 2008 Super League Grand Final defeat against Leeds. Following injuries to a number of Saints front-rowers in the 2008 season, Hargreaves established himself as a first-team regular alongside James Graham. In 2009, he was the first-choice starting prop alongside Graham, ahead of Jason Cayless and Maurie Fa'asavalu. Hargreaves played in the 2009 Super League Grand Final defeat against Leeds at Old Trafford.

=== Bradford Bulls ===
On 3 September 2010, it was announced that Hargreaves had signed a two-year contract with the Bradford Bulls for the 2011 and 2012 seasons.

2011

Hargreaves appeared in two of the four pre-season games. He played against Halifax and the Wakefield Trinity Wildcats. Hargreaves featured in 15 consecutive games from Round 1 against Leeds to Round 15 Salford City Reds. An injury kept him out for a few games, but Hargreaves then played in nine consecutive games from Round 19 against Leeds to Round 27 against the Wakefield Trinity Wildcats. He also appeared in the Challenge Cup games against Halifax and Wigan.

2012

Hargreaves featured in 18 consecutive games from Round 1 Catalans Dragons to Round 18 against the Wakefield Trinity Wildcats. He was injured for Round 19, but played in Round 20 against the London Broncos to Round 27 Catalans Dragons. He also featured in the Challenge Cup against Doncaster and Warrington. Hargreaves announced his retirement in September 2012, "bitterly disappointed, angry and above all disillusioned by events off the field". Hargreaves said that he had been offered a new job that could sustain him for life, unlike a career in Rugby League, adding "We’re pieces of meat at the end of the day and we’re not treated with much respect in rugby league as it is."

Season	Appearance	Tries	Goals	F/G	Points
2011	26	0	0	0	0
2012	28	1	0	0	4
Total	54	1	0	0	4

== Personal life ==
Hargreaves had a brother.

After retiring from rugby league, he emigrated to the United States, initially living in Pittsburgh, Pennsylvania before moving to West Virginia.

=== Disappearance and death ===
In January 2022, Hargreaves was reported missing in Cheat Lake, West Virginia, where he was last residing. On 20 March 2023, his family confirmed that his body had been found, 14 months after he was reported missing.
