= Ian Millward =

Australian professional rugby league coach

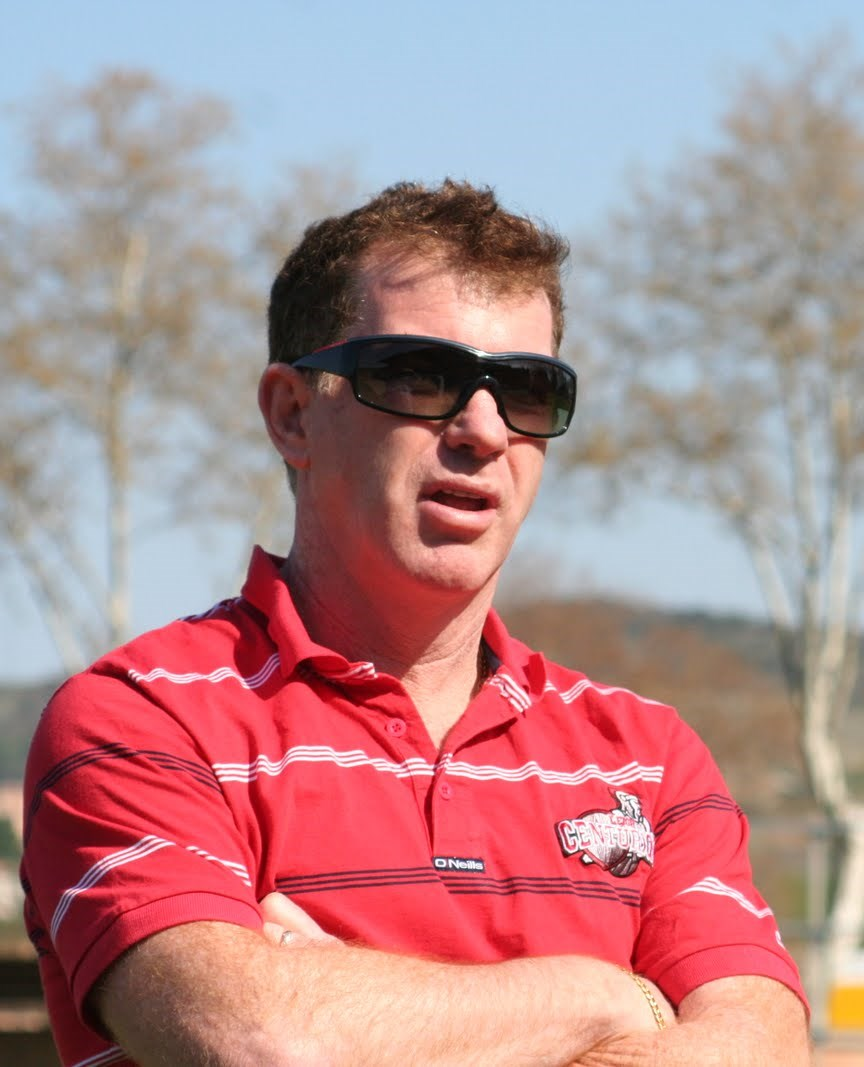

Personal information
- Born: 22 August 1960 (age 65) Wollongong, New South Wales, Australia

Coaching information
Club
Years	Team	Gms	W	D	L	W%
1999–00	Leigh Centurions	44	32	0	9	73
2000–05	St Helens	185	133	4	48	72
2005–06	Wigan Warriors	25	10	0	15	40
2008	North Queensland Cowboys	14	2	0	12	14
2009–11	Leigh Centurions	61	44	2	15	72
2012–13	Castleford Tigers	40	8	1	31	20
	Total	369	229	7	130	62
- Source: As of 13 June 2026

Ian "Basil" Millward (born 22 August 1960) is an Australian rugby league coach, occasional pundit and former player. Millward is now the assistant coach of St George Illawarra in the National Rugby League (NRL).

Millward is the former head coach of Wigan, St. Helens, Leigh and Castleford. He was in charge at Wigan from May 2005, his appointment coming just two weeks after an acrimonious departure from the club's fiercest rivals, St Helens. He was sacked by Wigan on 11 April 2006 for their poor start to 2006's Super League XI season – having won just one of eight league games. In October 2006 he returned to Australia. Millward lasted one and a half seasons at Castleford before leaving half-way through the 2013 season.

== Biography ==
Millward was born in Wollongong, New South Wales, and played rugby league for Illawarra Steelers lower grades in his youth, after impressing for the state's schoolboys team. His hopes of a successful playing career were ended when he was forced to retire in 1983 after suffering a serious neck injury.

He turned to coaching, taking up a position with Illawarra Western Suburbs. He also had spells with Wollongong University. In 1997, he was coach of the Steelers reserve grade team, as well as an assistant coach with the first grade Illawarra Steelers side. His first senior appointment came in 1998 when he took charge of struggling English side Leigh, who had then come close to relegation to the game's third tier. He soon transformed Leigh from relegation candidates to promotion contenders, catching the eye of a number of Super League clubs in the process. He moved to St Helens in March 2000 after the sacking of Ellery Hanley.

Under Millward, St Helens reached the 2000 Super League Grand Final and defeated Wigan Warriors, retaining their title. He took St Helens to the 2002 Super League Grand Final which they won against the Bradford Bulls. They also won the Rugby League Challenge Cup in 2001 and 2004 and the World Club Challenge in 2001. In 2001 Millward was named Super League Coach of the Year.

His time there was not without controversy, however. His decision to field an under-strength side due, he said, to injuries in a Super League match against Bradford, just a week before the Challenge Cup Final backfired badly. The move incurred the wrath of the game's authorities and St Helens were beaten in the final by Wigan, when all the injured players returned.

He repeated the trick in another match against Bradford over Easter 2004, claiming a heavy fixture burden had taken its toll. St Helens were well beaten in the game at Odsal Stadium and the fall-out overshadowed the rest of the club's season. It later emerged that two St Helens players, Sean Long and Martin Gleeson, had bet on their side to lose before the team was announced. Both were later banned and the Rugby Football League (RFL) tightened up rules by insisting squads had to be named 72 hours in advance.

Millward's St Helens career also ended controversially after he was suspended pending a disciplinary hearing in May 2005. He was sacked for gross misconduct a week later, his offences including three incidences of foul and abusive language: to a club employee; Warrington's press officer; and a fourth official at a match against Bradford. St Helens also claimed that Millward lied to an RFL disciplinary hearing and distorted the truth about the club's sale of Gleeson to Warrington in 2004.

Within a fortnight, Millward was at Wigan Warriors as head coach above Denis Betts. He had a difficult start with Wigan, losing a Super League match 70–0 to Leeds Rhinos and, more humiliatingly, a Challenge Cup tie at St Helens 75–0. Wigan ended the season seventh in the Super League, missing out on the play-offs for the first time in the competition and club's history.

After a disastrous start to the 2006 Super League, Millward was relieved of his duties as head coach of Wigan on 11 April 2006. During this time, a combination of poor performances and injuries to key players had seen Wigan slump to bottom of the engage Super League. Wigan had won just one of eight league games. The club issued this statement:

"Following a meeting of the board of directors the Wigan club can confirm that head coach Ian Millward has been dismissed with immediate effect. Ian will be leaving the club and team affairs will be managed in the short term by the assistant coaches Stuart Wilkinson and Andrew Farrar." He was replaced the following week by then Bradford Bulls coach, Brian Noble.

Millward enjoyed some time away from rugby league after being sacked by Wigan but later in 2006 he returned to the club where he started his English coaching career to become coaching co-ordinator at National League One side Leigh Centurions. Millward also worked as a co-presenter on rugby league matches shown on Sky Sports or BBC.

In 2007 Millward was appointed the assistant coach at National Rugby League side North Queensland Cowboys. After Graham Murray resigned in May 2008, Millward took over as a head coach for the remainder of the season.

Millward was appointed as assistant coach to David Furner at the Canberra Raiders on a two-year contract from 2009.

On 30 June 2009 it was announced that Millward would be re-joining Championship side Leigh Centurions in England from 2010. Millward signed a three-year contract after Canberra agreed to release Millward from his contract. He took over from Terry Matterson as the coach of Castleford starting for the 2012 season he has signed a 3-year deal to stay with the club. Millward was released by Castleford Tigers by mutual consent on 9 April 2013 after a very poor run of just one win in 18 games and with the team at the bottom of the Super League table at the time.

In 2014, Millward returned to Australia to coach the Illawarra Cutters NSW Cup team, replacing former Steelers centre Paul McGregor as coach. In 2015 he became assistant coach of the St George illawarra dragons to assist new coach Paul McGregor

Millward has worked as a TV pundit for the Super League Show broadcast on the BBC and also has featured as a summariser at televised games.
