= 2001 Wigan Warriors season =

Wigan Warriors 2001 season
- Super League VI Rank: 2nd
- Play-off result: Runners-up
- Challenge Cup: Round 4
- 2002 record: Wins: 22; draws: 1; losses: 6
- Points scored: For: 989; against: 404

Team information
- Stadium: JJB Stadium

Top scorers
- Tries: Kris Radlinski (30)
- Points: Andy Farrell (427)
| ← 2000 | List of seasons | 2002 → |

This article outlines the 2001 season for the British rugby league club Wigan Warriors. This season saw them compete in the Super League and Challenge Cup.

== League table ==
| Pos | Team | Pld | W | D | L | PF | PA | PD | Pts | Qualification |
|---|---|---|---|---|---|---|---|---|---|---|
| 1 | Bradford Bulls (L, C) | 28 | 22 | 1 | 5 | 1120 | 474 | +646 | 45 | Semi Final |
| 2 | Wigan Warriors | 28 | 22 | 1 | 5 | 989 | 494 | +495 | 45 | Qualifying play-off |
| 3 | Hull F.C. | 28 | 20 | 2 | 6 | 772 | 630 | +142 | 42 | Qualifying play-off |
| 4 | St Helens | 28 | 17 | 2 | 9 | 924 | 732 | +192 | 36 | Elimination play-off |
| 5 | Leeds Rhinos | 28 | 16 | 1 | 11 | 774 | 721 | +53 | 33 | Elimination play-off |
| 6 | London Broncos | 28 | 13 | 1 | 14 | 644 | 603 | +41 | 27 | |
| 7 | Warrington Wolves | 28 | 11 | 2 | 15 | 646 | 860 | −214 | 24 | |
| 8 | Castleford Tigers | 28 | 10 | 1 | 17 | 581 | 777 | −196 | 21 | |
| 9 | Halifax Blue Sox | 28 | 9 | 0 | 19 | 630 | 819 | −189 | 18 | |
| 10 | Salford City Reds | 28 | 8 | 0 | 20 | 587 | 956 | −369 | 16 | |
| 11 | Wakefield Trinity Wildcats | 28 | 8 | 0 | 20 | 529 | 817 | −288 | 14 (Note: Wakefield deducted 2 points for salary cap breaches.) | |
| 12 | Huddersfield Giants (R) | 28 | 6 | 1 | 21 | 613 | 926 | −313 | 13 | Relegation to Northern Ford Premiership |

Source: Rugby League Project
Rules for classification: 1) Points; 2) Points difference; 3) Number of points scored;
(C) Champions; (L) League Leaders; (R) Relegated

=== Play-offs ===
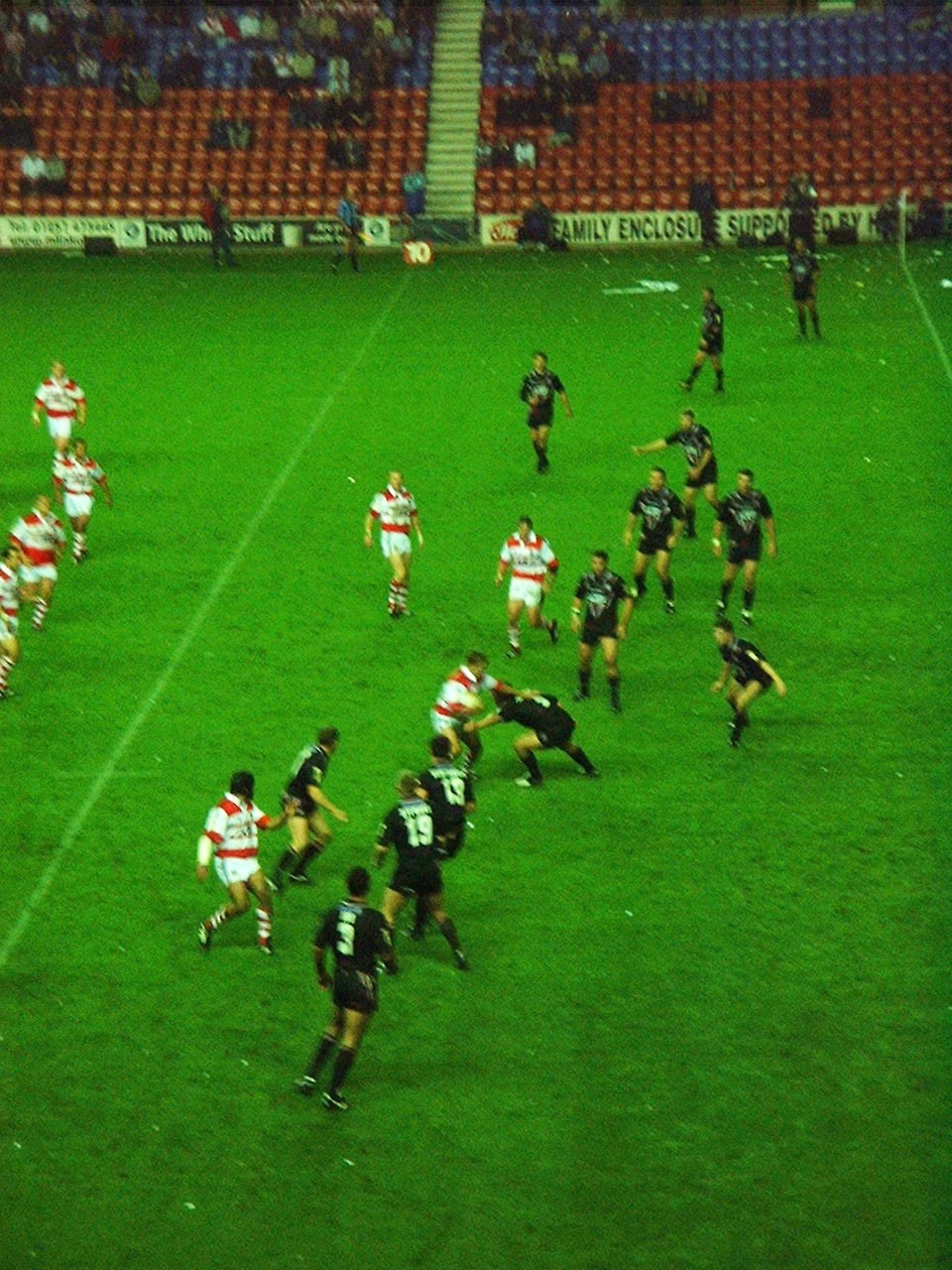
Wigan vs St Helens in the preliminary final

| Date | Round | Opponent | H/A | Result | Scorers | Att. |
|---|---|---|---|---|---|---|
| | Qualifying play-off | Hull F.C. | H | 27–24 | | |
| | Qualifying Semi Final | Bradford Bulls | A | 18–24 | | |
| 5 October 2001 | Elimination Final | St Helens | H | 44–10 | | |
| 13 October 2001 | Grand Final | Bradford Bulls | N | 37–6 | | 60,164 |

Grand Final match Report:

== Cup Run ==
| Date | Round | Opponent | H/A | Result | Scorers | Att. |
|---|---|---|---|---|---|---|
| 10 February 2001 | Fourth Round | St Helens | A | 8–22 | | 13,593 |
