= List of Wigan Warriors seasons =

The Wigan Warriors are an English professional rugby league club based in Wigan, Greater Manchester. The club was formed in 1872, and was a founder member of the Northern Rugby Football Union in 1895.

The club is the most successful in the history of world rugby league, winning 22 league championships (four in the Super League era), the Challenge Cup 20 times (including eight consecutive wins between 1988 and 1995) the World Club Challenge four times and over 100 honours in total. The club has also only been relegated once in its history (in 1979–80).

== Seasons ==
=== Pre-Super League era ===
Season	League									Play-offs	Challenge Cup	Lancashire Cup	League Cup	Other Competitions		Name	Tries	Name	Points
Season	Division	P	W	D	L	F	A	Pts	Pos	Play-offs	Challenge Cup	Lancashire Cup	League Cup	Other Competitions		Top try scorer		Top point scorer	
1895–96	NRFU	42	19	7	16	245	147	45	10th							Teddy Flowers	11	Teddy Flowers	45
1896–97	LSC	26	8	7	11	73	118	23	11th		R3					F Foster	3	Jimmy Walkden	22
1897–98	LSC	26	11	1	14	124	173	23	6th		R1					Billy Rhoden	8	John Timoney	27
1898–99	LSC	26	4	2	20	66	238	10	13th		R2					John Timoney	4	John Winstanley	18
1899–1900	LSC	26	7	1	18	73	230	15	13th		R1					Tom Nicholson; Tom White	5	Tom White	16
1900–01	LSC	26	8	3	15	98	227	19	9th		R1					Jimmy Barr; George Rigby	5	George Rigby	17
1901–02	LSC	n/a						42	1st		R2					Jimmy Barr	29	Jimmy Barr	89
1902–03	NRFU-1	34	10	6	18	125	174	26	16th		R2					Jimmy Barr	5	Dicky Rothwell	35
1903–04	NRFU-1	34	11	6	17	177	174	28	10th		R2					Jim Leytham	15	Jim Leytham	47
1904–05	NRFU-1	34	18	1	15	230	195	37	7th		QF					Jim Leytham	18	Jim Leytham	72
1905–06	NRFU	34	22	1	11	441	167	45	6th		R1	W				Jim Leytham	36	Jim Leytham	144
1906–07	NRFU	34	23	1	10	656	278	47	5th		R2	R1				Jim Leytham	31	Jim Leytham	187
1907–08	NRFU	32	23	1	8	501	181	47	4th	SF	R2	R2				Jim Leytham	38	Jim Leytham	172
1908–09	NRFU	32	28	0	4	706	207	56	1st	W	SF	W				Joe Miller	47	Jim Leytham	253
1909–10	NRFU	30	23	1	6	545	169	47	3rd	RU	R2	W				Jim Leytham	47	Jim Leytham	225
1910–11	NRFU	34	28	1	5	650	205	57	1st	RU	RU	R1				Joe Miller	33	Jim Leytham	150
1911–12	NRFU	34	27	1	6	483	215	55	2nd	RU	R2	SF				Lance Todd	21	Johnny Thomas	78
1912–13	NRFU	34	28	0	6	702	249	56	2nd	RU	QF	W				Lew Bradley	37	Johnny Thomas	194
1913–14	NRFU	34	25	2	7	676	252	52	3rd	SF	QF	RU				Lew Bradley	39	Johnny Thomas	190
1914–15	NRFU	32	25	1	6	679	206	51	2nd	SF	SF	RU				Billy Curran	44	Johnny Thomas	169
1915–16	WEL	33	21	3	9	306	191	45	4th							Vince Smith	13	Bill Jolley	72
1916–17	WEL	32	21	0	11	340	168	42	5th							Vince Smith	20	Bill Jolley	64
1917–18	WEL	35	21	0	14	331	210	42	9th							Vince Smith	26	Bill Jolley	82
1918–19	WEL	n/a														Vince Smith	5	Vince Smith	15
1919	LANC	11	7	1	3	164	87	15	3rd			SF				John Blan	11	John Blan	47
1919–20	NRFU	32	15	1	16	281	266	31	13th		RU	R2				Harry Hall	17	Bill Jolley	74
1920–21	NRFU	34	23	1	10	435	238	47	4th	SF	R1	R2				Tommy Howley	19	Tommy Howley	91
1921–22	NRFU	32	22	1	9	446	159	45	2nd	W	SF	R1				Tom Coles	22	Jim Sullivan	201
1922–23	RFL	36	25	2	9	721	262	52	5th		SF	W				Johnny Ring	41	Jim Sullivan	341
1923–24	RFL	38	31	0	7	824	228	62	1st	RU	W	R2				Johnny Ring	48	Jim Sullivan	305
1924–25	RFL	36	27	1	8	784	258	55	3rd	SF	R2	R1				Johnny Ring	52	Jim Sullivan	270
1925–26	RFL	38	29	3	6	641	310	61	1st	W	R2	RU				Johnny Ring	62	Jim Sullivan	263
1926–27	RFL	40	29	0	11	691	366	58	3rd	SF	R2	R1				Johnny Ring	48	Jim Sullivan	277
1927–28	RFL	40	24	0	16	601	345	48	8th		R1	RU				Lou Brown	27	Jim Sullivan	193
1928–29	RFL	38	26	1	11	636	308	53	5th		W	W				Lou Brown	44	Jim Sullivan	192
1929–30	RFL	38	23	1	14	590	303	47	7th		SF	R1				Lou Brown	32	Jim Sullivan	182
1930–31	RFL	38	28	2	8	657	199	58	3rd	SF	R1	RU				Bob Brown; Johnny Ring	33	Jim Sullivan	242
1931–32	RFL	38	22	2	14	559	361	46	7th		QF	R2				Gwynne Davies; Dicky Twose	13	Jim Sullivan	243
1932–33	RFL	38	25	2	11	717	411	52	4th	SF	QF	SF				Jack Morley	47	Jim Sullivan	291
1933–34	RFL	38	26	0	12	739	334	52	2nd	W	R2	SF				Jack Morley	43	Jim Sullivan	336
1934–35	RFL	38	26	4	8	790	290	56	3rd	SF	QF	RU				Jack Morley	48	Jim Sullivan	340
1935–36	RFL	38	25	1	12	543	328	51	4th	SF	QF	RU				Alf Ellaby	38	Jim Sullivan	227
1936–37	RFL	38	26	0	12	591	336	52	5th		SF	RU				Jack Morley	20	Jim Sullivan	246
1937–38	RFL	36	22	1	13	478	329	45	9th		R1	R2				Eddie Holder	21	Jim Sullivan	223
1938–39	RFL	40	25	0	15	566	365	50	9th		SF	W				Jack Morley	27	Jim Sullivan	250
1939–40	RFL	n/a																	
1939–40	WEL	22	16	1	5	301	157	33	3rd			R2				Johnny Lawrenson	22	Jim Sullivan	129
1940–41	WEL	16	15	1	0	297	71	31	1st	RU	R2	R1				Johnny Lawrenson	18	Johnny Lawrenson	74
1941–42	WEL	20	11	0	9	241	207	22	6th		SF	SF				Johnny Lawrenson	22	Johnny Lawrenson	118
1942–43	WEL	16	13	0	3	301	141	26	1st	SF	R1	SF				George Aspinall	16	Jim Sullivan	96
1943–44	WEL	21	17	0	4	302	143	34	2nd	W	RU	R2				Johnny Lawrenson	19	Johnny Lawrenson	103
1944–45	WEL	24	17	1	6	302	138	35	4th	SF	R1	SF				Johnny Lawrenson	16	Johnny Lawrenson	80
1945–46	RFL	36	29	2	5	783	219	60	1st	W	RU	RU				Gordon Ratcliffe; Jack Taylor	28	Ted Ward	115
1946–47	RFL	36	29	1	6	567	196	59	1st	W	QF	W				Ernie Ashcroft	34	Johnny Lawrenson	159
1947–48	RFL	36	31	1	4	776	258	63	1st	SF	W	W				Gordon Ratcliffe	45	Ted Ward	279
1948–49	RFL	36	28	1	7	802	286	57	2nd	SF	QF	W				Gordon Ratcliffe	35	Ted Ward	343
1949–50	RFL	36	31	1	4	853	320	63	1st	W	R2	W				Brian Nordgren	57	Ken Gee	269
1950–51	RFL	36	29	1	6	774	288	59	2nd	SF	W	W				Brian Nordgren	42	Ken Gee	176
1951–52	RFL	36	27	1	8	750	296	55	2nd	W	QF	W				Brian Nordgren	39	Ken Gee	225
1952–53	RFL	36	19	2	15	673	414	40	11th		SF	R2				Brian Nordgren	47	Ken Gee	177
1953–54	RFL	36	23	1	12	688	392	47	7th		QF	RU				Brian Nordgren	25	Jack Cunliffe	134
1954–55	RFL	36	26	1	9	643	328	53	5th		R1	R1				Billy Boston	31	Brian Nordgren	224
1955–56	RFL	34	22	2	10	596	402	46	5th		SF	R1		ITV Floodlit Trophy	R1	Billy Boston	43	Eric Ashton	164
1956–57	RFL	38	26	0	12	750	417	52	6th		R1	R1				Billy Boston	50	Eric Ashton	244
1957–58	RFL	38	27	0	11	815	430	54	5th		W	RU				Billy Boston	41	Jack Cunliffe	232
1958–59	RFL	38	29	0	9	894	491	58	2nd	SF	W	R2				Billy Boston	54	Fred Griffiths	394
1959–60	RFL	38	27	2	9	828	390	56	4th	W	QF	SF				Billy Boston	46	Fred Griffiths	267
1960–61	RFL	36	26	0	10	689	334	52	5th		RU	R2				Billy Boston	35	Fred Griffiths	274
1961–62	RFL	36	32	1	3	885	283	65	1st	SF	QF	R2				Billy Boston	49	Fred Griffiths	370
1962–63	RFL-1	30	14	2	14	476	393	30	8th		RU	R2				Frank Carlton	23	Fred Griffiths	132
1963–64	RFL-1	30	21	2	7	530	294	44	2nd		R1	R2				Trevor Lake	43	Laurie Gilfedder	259
1964–65	RFL	34	26	0	8	626	260	52	2nd	R1	W	R2				Trevor Lake	40	Laurie Gilfedder	236
1965–66	RFL	34	27	0	7	604	302	54	3rd	SF	RU	R2				Trevor Lake	32	Laurie Gilfedder	216
1966–67	RFL	34	17	0	17	513	456	34	17th		R2	W				Billy Boston	18	Eric Ashton	112
1967–68	RFL	34	21	0	13	602	350	42	11th	SF	SF	R1		BBC2 Floodlit Trophy	SF	Bill Francis	29	Colin Tyrer	290
1968–69	RFL	34	25	2	7	732	368	52	3rd	R2	R2	R1		BBC2 Floodlit Trophy	W	Bill Francis	40	Colin Tyrer	315
1969–70	RFL	34	23	0	11	698	420	46	4th	R1	RU	SF		BBC2 Floodlit Trophy	RU	David Hill	31	Colin Tyrer	385
1970–71	RFL	34	30	0	4	662	308	60	1st	RU	R2	SF		BBC2 Floodlit Trophy	SF	Stuart Wright	30	Colin Tyrer	275
1971–72	RFL	34	25	0	9	702	314	50	4th	R2	R2	W	QF	BBC2 Floodlit Trophy	R1	Stuart Wright	30	Colin Tyrer	275
1972–73	RFL	34	17	1	16	577	491	35	16th	R1	QF	SF	R1	BBC2 Floodlit Trophy	R2	Warren Ayres	15	Colin Tyrer	189
1973–74	RFL-1	30	12	3	15	427	364	27	11th	R1	QF	W	R2	BBC2 Floodlit Trophy	Prelim	Warren Ayres	20	John Gray	144
1973–74	RFL-1	30	12	3	15	427	364	27	11th	R1	QF	W	R2	Captain Morgan Trophy	R1	Warren Ayres	20	John Gray	144
1974–75	RFL-1	30	21	0	9	517	341	42	2nd	SF	R2	R1	R2	BBC2 Floodlit Trophy	R1	Stuart Wright	17	George Fairbairn	149
1975–76	RFL-1	30	18	3	9	514	399	39	5th	R1	R2	R2	R2	BBC2 Floodlit Trophy	R2	Stuart Wright	19	George Fairbairn	231
1976–77	RFL-1	30	15	2	13	463	416	32	7th	R1	R2	R2	R2	BBC2 Floodlit Trophy	R2	Green Vigo	18	George Fairbairn	180
1977–78	RFL-1	30	17	1	12	482	435	35	5th	R1	R2	RU	QF	BBC2 Floodlit Trophy	R1	Green Vigo	27	George Fairbairn	127
1978–79	RFL-1	30	16	1	13	484	411	33	6th	SF	R2	R1	R2	BBC2 Floodlit Trophy	R1	Keiron O'Loughlin	20	George Fairbairn	159
1979–80	RFL-1	30	9	3	18	366	523	21	13th		R1	R1	R2	BBC2 Floodlit Trophy	R1	Jimmy Hornby	11	George Fairbairn	172
1980–81	RFL-2	28	20	3	5	597	293	43	2nd		R1	RU	R1			Dennis Ramsdale	19	George Fairbairn	183
1981–82	RFL-1	30	12	0	18	424	435	24	11th		R2	R2	R1			Henderson Gill	12	Colin Whitfield	156
1982–83	RFL-1	30	20	3	7	482	270	43	3rd	R1	R1	R2	W			Henderson Gill	18	Colin Whitfield	239
1983–84	RFL-1	30	16	0	14	533	465	32	9th		RU	R1	QF			Henderson Gill	16	Colin Whitfield	291
1984–85	RFL-1	30	21	1	8	720	459	43	3rd	SF	W	RU	R2			Henderson Gill	33	Colin Whitfield	191
1985–86	RFL-1	30	20	3	7	776	300	43	2nd	SF	QF	W	W	Charity Shield	W	Ellery Hanley	35	David Stephenson	320
1986–87	RFL-1	30	28	0	2	941	193	56	1st	W	R1	W	W			Ellery Hanley	59	Henderson Gill	264
1987–88	RFL-1	26	17	2	7	621	327	36	3rd	R1	W	W	SF	Charity Shield	W	Ellery Hanley	31	David Stephenson	138
1987–88	RFL-1	26	17	2	7	621	327	36	3rd	R1	W	W	SF	World Club Challenge	W	Ellery Hanley	31	David Stephenson	138
1988–89	RFL-1	26	19	0	7	543	434	38	2nd	R1	W	W	W	Charity Shield	RU	Ellery Hanley	25	Joe Lydon	210
1989–90	RFL-1	26	20	0	6	699	349	40	1st	R2	W	SF	W	Charity Shield	RU	Mark Preston	32	Joe Lydon	206
1990–91	RFL-1	26	20	2	4	652	313	42	1st	R1	W	R2	QF	Charity Shield	RU	Ellery Hanley	29	Frano Botica	324
1991–92	RFL-1	26	22	0	4	645	307	44	1st	W	W	SF	QF	Charity Shield	W	Shaun Edwards	40	Frano Botica	364
1991–92	RFL-1	26	22	0	4	645	307	44	1st	W	W	SF	QF	World Club Challenge	W	Shaun Edwards	40	Frano Botica	364
1992–93	RFL-1	26	20	1	5	744	327	41	1st	RU	W	W	W	Charity Shield	RU	Shaun Edwards	43	Frano Botica	423
1992–93	RFL-1	26	20	1	5	744	327	41	1st	RU	W	W	W	World Club Challenge	RU	Shaun Edwards	43	Frano Botica	423
1993–94	RFL-1	30	23	0	7	780	403	46	1st	W	W		RU	World Club Challenge	W	Martin Offiah	35	Frano Botica	412
1994–95	RFL-1	30	28	0	2	1148	386	56	1st	W	W		W			Martin Offiah	53	Frano Botica	408
1995–96	RFL-1	20	18	0	2	810	316	36	1st				W	Charity Shield	W	Martin Offiah	26	Andy Farrell	194

=== Super League era ===
Season	League									Play-offs	Challenge Cup	Other competitions		Name	Tries	Name	Points
Season	Division	P	W	D	L	F	A	Pts	Pos	Play-offs	Challenge Cup	Other competitions		Top try scorer		Top point scorer	
1996	Super League	22	19	1	2	902	326	39	2nd		R5	Premiership	W	Jason Robinson	26	Andy Farrell	256
1996	Super League	22	19	1	2	902	326	39	2nd		R5	Middlesex Sevens	W	Jason Robinson	26	Andy Farrell	256
1997	Super League	22	14	0	8	683	398	28	4th		R4	Premiership	W	Jason Robinson	20	Andy Farrell	332
1997	Super League	22	14	0	8	683	398	28	4th		R4	World Club Challenge	QF	Jason Robinson	20	Andy Farrell	332
1998	Super League	23	21	0	2	762	222	42	1st	Won in Grand Final	RU			Jason Robinson	17	Andy Farrell	333
1999	Super League	30	21	1	8	877	390	43	4th	Lost in elimination play-off	R4			Jason Robinson	20	Andy Farrell	217
2000	Super League	28	24	1	3	960	405	49	1st	Lost in Grand Final	QF			Jason Robinson; Steve Renouf	23	Andy Farrell	409
2001	Super League	28	22	1	5	989	494	45	2nd	Lost in Grand Final	R4			Kris Radlinski	30	Andy Farrell	427
2002	Super League	28	19	1	8	817	475	39	3rd	Lost in final eliminator	W			David Hodgson	20	Andy Farrell	267
2003	Super League	28	19	2	7	776	512	40	3rd	Lost in Grand Final	SF			David Hodgson	20	Andy Farrell	213
2004	Super League	28	17	4	7	736	558	38	4th	Lost in final eliminator	RU			Brett Dallas	24	Andy Farrell	261
2005	Super League	28	14	0	14	698	718	28	7th	Did not qualify	QF			Dennis Moran	15	Danny Tickle	265
2006	Super League	28	12	0	16	644	715	22	8th	Did not qualify	R5			Chris Ashton	14	Michael Dobson	142
2007	Super League	27	15	1	11	621	527	27	6th	Lost in final eliminator	SF			Trent Barrett	18	Pat Richards	320
2008	Super League	27	13	3	11	648	698	29	4th	Lost in final eliminator	QF			Pat Richards	21	Pat Richards	375
2009	Super League	27	15	0	12	659	551	30	6th	Lost in semi-final	SF			Pat Richards	23	Pat Richards	296
2010	Super League	27	22	0	5	922	411	44	1st	Won in Grand Final	QF			Pat Richards	32	Pat Richards	462
2011	Super League	27	20	3	4	852	432	43	2nd	Lost in semi-final	W	World Club Challenge	RU	Sam Tomkins	33	Pat Richards	382
2012	Super League	27	21	0	6	994	449	42	1st	Lost in semi-final	SF			Sam Tomkins; Josh Charnley	36	Josh Charnley	294
2013	Super League	27	17	1	9	816	460	35	4th	Won in Grand Final	W			Josh Charnley	43	Pat Richards	367
2014	Super League	27	18	1	8	834	429	35	2nd	Lost in Grand Final	QF	World Club Challenge	RU	Joe Burgess	25	Matty Smith	285
2015	Super League	30	20	1	9	798	530	41	2nd	Lost in Grand Final	R6			Joe Burgess	26	Matty Smith	176
2016	Super League	30	20	1	9	803	533	41	2nd	Won in Grand Final	SF			Josh Charnley	24	Matty Smith	221
2017	Super League	30	14	3	13	691	668	31	6th	Did not qualify	RU	World Club Challenge	W	Joe Burgess	26	George Williams	153
2018	Super League	30	23	0	7	740	417	46	2nd	Won in Grand Final	QF			Liam Marshall	17	Sam Tomkins	252
2019	Super League	29	18	0	11	699	539	36	2nd	Lost in preliminary final	R6	World Club Challenge	RU	Liam Marshall	17	Zak Hardaker	243
2020	Super League	17	13	0	4	408	278	76.47	1st	Lost in Grand Final	SF			TBA			
2021	Super League	25	15	0	10	387	385	60.00	4th	Lost in elimination playoffs	QF			TBA			
2022	Super League	27	19	0	8	818	483	38	2nd	Lost in semi-final	W			Bevan French	29	Harry Smith	186
2023	Super League	27	20	0	7	722	360	40	1st	Won in Grand Final	SF			Abbas Miski	28	Harry Smith	184
2024	Super League	27	22	0	5	723	338	44	1st	Won in Grand Final	W	World Club Challenge	W	Liam Marshall	27	Adam Keighran	172
2025	Super League	27	21	0	6	794	333	42	2nd	Lost in Grand Final	R4	World Club Challenge	Won by default				
2026	Super League	27	22	0	5	851	439	44	1st	Lost in semi-finals	W						

== Bibliography ==
- "Rugby League Hall of Fame". Archived from the original on 13 May 2008.
- "Wigan Warriors Rugby League Fan Site". cherryandwhite.co.uk. RLFANS.COM.
- "Wigan Warriors - Seasons". Rugby League Project. Shawn Dollin, Andrew Ferguson and Bill Bates.
