= 2002 Wigan Warriors season =

Wigan Warriors 2002 season
- 2002 Challenge Cup champions
- Super League VII Rank: 3rd
- Play-off result: Lost in Elimination Final
- Challenge Cup: Champions
- 2002 record: Wins: 24; draws: 1; losses: 8
- Points scored: For: 817; against: 475

Team information
- Stadium: JJB Stadium

Top scorers
- Tries: David Hodgson (20)
- Points: Andy Farrell (267)
← 2001	List of seasons	2003 →

This article outlines the 2002 season for the British rugby league club Wigan Warriors. This season saw them compete in the Super League and Challenge Cup.

== League table ==
Pos	Team	Pld	W	D	L	PF	PA	PD	Pts	Qualification
1	St Helens (L, C)	28	23	0	5	927	522	+405	46	Semi-final
2	Bradford Bulls	28	23	0	5	910	519	+391	46	Semi-final
3	Wigan Warriors	28	19	1	8	817	475	+342	39	Elimination play-offs
4	Leeds Rhinos	28	17	0	11	865	700	+165	34	Elimination play-offs
5	Hull F.C.	28	16	0	12	742	674	+68	32	Elimination play-offs
6	Castleford Tigers	28	14	2	12	736	615	+121	30	Elimination play-offs
7	Widnes Vikings	28	14	1	13	590	716	−126	29	
8	London Broncos	28	13	1	14	661	635	+26	27	
9	Halifax Blue Sox	28	8	0	20	558	856	−298	16	
10	Warrington Wolves	28	7	0	21	483	878	−395	14	
11	Wakefield Trinity Wildcats	28	5	2	21	566	899	−333	12	
12	Salford City Reds (R)	28	5	1	22	490	856	−366	11	Relegation to National League One

Source: Rugby League Project
Rules for classification: 1) Points; 2) Points difference; 3) Number of points scored;
(C) Champions; (L) League Leaders' Shield Winners; (R) Relegated

=== Play-offs ===
Date	Round	Opponent	H/A	Result	Scorers	Att.
	Elimination Play-off 1		H			
	Elimination Semi Final		H			
	Elimination Final	Bradford Bulls	A	8–24		

== Cup Run ==
Date	Round	Opponent	H/A	Result	Scorers	Att.
9 February 2002	Fourth Round	Hull F.C.	H	34–10		
24 February 2002	Fifth Round	Union Treiziste Catalane	A	72–6		
16 March 2002	Quarter Final	Leigh Centurions	A	30–16		
13 April 2002	Semi Final	Castleford	N	20–10		
27 April 2002	Final	St Helens	N	21–12		
