= 1999 Wigan Warriors season =

Wigan Warriors 1999 season
- Super League IV Rank: 4th
- Play-off result: Lost in Elimination play-off
- Challenge Cup: Fourth Round
- 1999 record: Wins: 21; draws: 1; losses: 9
- Points scored: For: 877; against: 390

Team information
- Stadium: Central Park (until September); JJB Stadium (from September)

Top scorers
- Tries: Jason Robinson (20)
- Points: Andy Farrell (217)
← 1998	List of seasons	2000 →

This article outlines the 1999 season for the British rugby league club Wigan Warriors. This season saw them compete in the Super League and Challenge Cup.

== League table ==
	Team	Pld	W	D	L	PF	PA	PD	Pts	Qualification
1	Bradford Bulls	30	25	1	4	897	445	+452	51	Play-off Semi Final
2	St. Helens	30	23	0	7	1034	561	+473	46	Play-off Qualifying Final
3	Leeds Rhinos	30	22	1	7	910	558	+352	45	Play-off Qualifying Final
4	Wigan Warriors	30	21	1	8	877	390	+487	43	Play-off Eliminator Final
5	Castleford Tigers	30	19	3	8	712	451	+261	41	Play-off Eliminator Final
6	Gateshead Thunder	30	19	1	10	775	576	+199	39	
7	Warrington Wolves	30	15	1	14	700	717	-17	31	
8	London Broncos	30	13	2	15	644	708	-64	28	
9	Halifax Blue Sox	30	11	0	19	573	792	-219	22	
10	Sheffield Eagles	30	10	1	19	518	818	-300	21	
11	Wakefield Trinity Wildcats	30	10	0	20	608	795	-187	20	
12	Salford City Reds	30	6	1	23	526	916	-390	13	
13	Hull Sharks	30	5	0	25	422	921	-499	10	
14	Huddersfield Giants	30	5	0	25	463	1011	-548	10	

=== Play-offs ===
Wigan's first round opponents in the Super League play-offs were Castleford Tigers. Playing for the first time at their new home ground, the JJB Stadium, Wigan lost the match 10–14. The defeat meant that Wigan finished the season without winning a trophy, the first time this had occurred since the 1983–84 season.

Date	Round	Opponent	H/A	Result	Scorers	Att.
19 September 1999	Elimination Play-off	Castleford Tigers	H	10–14		

== Cup Run ==
Date	Round	Opponent	H/A	Result	Scorers	Att.
14 February 1999	Fourth Round	Leeds Rhinos	A	18–28		
