= Rugby League Charity Shield =

Rugby League Charity Shield may refer to:

- Rugby League Charity Shield (Great Britain)
- Charity Shield (NRL), in Australia
