= 2000 Wigan Warriors season =

Wigan Warriors 2000 season
- Super League V Rank: 1st
- Play-off result: Runners-up
- Challenge Cup: Quarter-finals
- 2000 record: Wins: 23; draws: 1; losses: 4
- Points scored: For: 960; against: 405

Team information
- Stadium: JJB Stadium

Top scorers
- Tries: Jason Robinson and Steve Renouf (23 each)
- Points: Andy Farrell (409)
← 1999	List of seasons	2001 →

This article outlines the 2000 season for the British rugby league club Wigan Warriors. This season saw them compete in the Super League and Challenge Cup.

== League table ==
Super League V
Pos	Team	Pld	W	D	L	PF	PA	PD	Pts	Qualification
1	Wigan Warriors (L)	28	24	1	3	960	405	+555	49	Semi Final
2	St Helens (C)	28	23	0	5	988	627	+361	46	Qualifying Semi Final
3	Bradford Bulls	28	20	3	5	1004	408	+596	43	Qualifying Semi Final
4	Leeds Rhinos	28	17	0	11	692	626	+66	34	Elimination Semi Final
5	Castleford Tigers	28	17	0	11	585	571	+14	34	Elimination Semi Final
6	Warrington Wolves	28	13	0	15	735	817	−82	26	
7	Hull F.C.	28	12	1	15	630	681	−51	25	
8	Halifax Blue Sox	28	11	1	16	664	703	−39	23	
9	Salford City Reds	28	10	0	18	542	910	−368	20	
10	Wakefield Trinity Wildcats	28	8	0	20	557	771	−214	16	
11	London Broncos	28	6	0	22	456	770	−314	12	
12	Huddersfield-Sheffield Giants	28	4	0	24	502	1026	−524	8	

Source: Rugby League Project
Rules for classification: 1) Points; 2) Points difference; 3) Number of points scored;
(C) Champions; (L) League Leaders

=== Play-offs ===
Date	Round	Opponent	H/A	Result	Scorers	Att.
	Semi-final 2	St Helens	H	16–54		
	Elimination Final	Bradford Bulls	H	40–12		
14 October 2000	Grand Final	St Helens	N	16–29		

== Cup Run ==
Date	Round	Opponent	H/A	Result	Scorers	Att.
13 February 2000	Fourth Round	Whitehaven	H	98–4		
27 February 2000	Fifth Round	Doncaster Dragons	H	38–2		
10 March 2000	Quarter Final	Hull Sharks	A	4–14		
