= 2005 Wigan Warriors season =

Wigan Warriors 2005 season
- Super League X Rank: 7th
- Play-off result: Did not qualify
- Challenge Cup: Quarter-finals
- 2005 record: Wins: 16; draws: 0; losses: 15
- Points scored: For: 698; against: 718

Team information
- Stadium: JJB Stadium

Top scorers
- Tries: Dennis Moran (43)
- Points: Danny Tickle (256)
← 2004	List of seasons	2006 →

This article outlines the 2005 season for the British rugby league club Wigan Warriors. This season saw them compete in the Super League and Challenge Cup.

== League table ==
Pos	Team	Pld	W	D	L	PF	PA	PD	Pts	Qualification or relegation
1	St Helens	28	23	1	4	1028	537	+491	47	Semi Final
2	Leeds Rhinos	28	22	0	6	1152	505	+647	44	Semi Final
3	Bradford Bulls	28	18	1	9	1038	684	+354	37	Elimination Semi Final
4	Warrington Wolves	28	18	0	10	792	702	+90	36	Elimination Semi Final
5	Hull F.C.	28	15	2	11	756	670	+86	32	Elimination Semi Final
6	London Broncos	28	13	2	13	800	718	+82	28	Elimination Semi Final
7	Wigan Warriors	28	14	0	14	698	718	−20	28	
8	Huddersfield Giants	28	12	0	16	742	791	−49	24	
9	Salford City Reds	28	11	0	17	549	732	−183	22	
10	Wakefield Trinity Wildcats	28	10	0	18	716	999	−283	20	
11	Widnes Vikings	28	6	1	21	598	1048	−450	13	Relegation to National League One
12	Leigh Centurions	28	2	1	25	445	1210	−765	5	Relegation to National League One

Source: Rugby League Project
Rules for classification: 1) Points; 2) Points difference; 3) Number of points scored;

== Cup Run ==
Date	Round	Opponent	H/A	Result	Scorers	Att.
3 April 2005	Fourth Round	Whitehaven Warriors	H	42–4		
6 May 2005	Fifth Round	Union Treiziste Catalane	H	16–10		
26 June 2005	Quarter Final	St Helens	A	75–0		
