= 2004 Wigan Warriors season =

Wigan Warriors 2004 season
- Super League IX Rank: 4th
- Play-off result: Lost in Final Eliminator
- Challenge Cup: Runners-up
- 2004 record: Wins: 18; draws: 4; losses: 8
- Points scored: For: 736; against: 558

Team information
- Stadium: JJB Stadium

Top scorers
- Tries: Brett Dallas (24)
- Points: Andy Farrell (261)
← 2003	List of seasons	2005 →

This article outlines the 2004 season for the British rugby league club Wigan Warriors. This season saw them compete in the Super League and Challenge Cup.

== League table ==
Super League IX
Pos.	Team	Pld	W	D	L	PF	PA	PD	Pts	Qual.
1	Leeds Rhinos	28	24	2	2	1037	443	+594	50	Play-off semi-final
2	Bradford Bulls	28	20	1	7	918	565	+353	41	Play-off semi-final
3	Hull	28	19	2	7	843	478	+365	40	Play-off elimination final
4	Wigan Warriors	28	17	4	7	736	558	+178	38	Play-off elimination final
5	St. Helens	28	17	1	10	821	662	+159	35	Play-off elimination final
6	Wakefield Trinity Wildcats	28	15	0	13	788	662	+126	30	Play-off elimination final
7	Huddersfield Giants	28	12	0	16	518	757	−239	24	
8	Warrington Wolves	28	10	1	17	700	715	−15	21	
9	Salford City Reds	28	8	0	20	507	828	−321	16	
10	London Broncos	28	7	1	20	561	968	−407	15	
11	Widnes Vikings	28	7	0	21	466	850	−384	14	
12	Castleford Tigers	28	6	0	22	515	924	−409	12	Relegated to National League 1

Source: Rugby League Project.
Classification: 1st on competition points; 2nd on match points difference.
Competition points: for win = 2; for draw = 1; for loss = 0.

=== Play-offs ===
Date	Round	Opponent	H/A	Result	Scorers	Att.
	Elimination Play-off 2	St Helens	H	18–12		
	Elimination Semi Final	Wakefield Trinity Wildcats	H	18–14		
	Elimination Final	Leeds Rhinos	A	12–40		

== Cup Run ==
Date	Round	Opponent	H/A	Result	Scorers	Att.
29 April 2004	Fourth Round	Widnes Vikings	H	38–12		
14 March 2004	Fifth Round	Limoux Grizzlies	A	80–20		
28 March 2004	Quarter Final	Wakefield Trinity Wildcats	H	20–4		
25 April 2004	Semi Final	Warrington Wolves	H	30–18		
15 May 2004	Final	St Helens	N	16–32		
