= 2003 Wigan Warriors season =

Wigan Warriors 2003 season
- Super League VIII Rank: 3rd
- Play-off result: Runners-up
- Challenge Cup: Semi-final
- 2003 record: Wins: 22; draws: 2; losses: 8
- Points scored: For: 776; against: 512

Team information
- Stadium: JJB Stadium

Top scorers
- Tries: David Hodgson (20)
- Points: Andy Farrell (213)
← 2002	List of seasons	2004 →

This article outlines the 2003 season for the British rugby league club Wigan Warriors. This season saw them compete in the Super League and Challenge Cup.

== League table ==
Pos	Team	Pld	W	D	L	PF	PA	PD	Pts	Qualification
1	Bradford Bulls (L, C)	28	22	0	6	878	529	+349	44	Semi-final
2	Leeds Rhinos	28	19	3	6	751	555	+196	41	Semi-final
3	Wigan Warriors	28	19	2	7	776	512	+264	40	Elimination play-offs
4	St Helens	28	16	1	11	845	535	+310	31 (Note: St Helens deducted 2 points for salary cap breaches.)	Elimination play-offs
5	London Broncos	28	14	2	12	643	696	−53	30	Elimination play-offs
6	Warrington Wolves	28	14	1	13	748	619	+129	29	Elimination play-offs
7	Hull F.C.	28	13	3	12	701	577	+124	27 (Note: Hull F.C. deducted 2 points for salary cap breaches.)	
8	Castleford Tigers	28	12	1	15	612	633	−21	25	
9	Widnes Vikings	28	12	1	15	640	727	−87	25	
10	Huddersfield Giants	28	11	1	16	628	715	−87	23	
11	Wakefield Trinity Wildcats	28	7	1	20	505	774	−269	15	
12	Halifax (R)	28	1	0	27	372	1227	−855	0 (Note: Halifax deducted 2 points for salary cap breaches.)	Relegation to National League One

Source: Rugby League Project
Rules for classification: 1) Points; 2) Points difference; 3) Number of points scored;
(C) Champions; (L) League Leaders' Shield Winners; (R) Relegated
Notes:

=== Play-offs ===
Date	Round	Opponent	H/A	Result	Scorers	Att.
	Elimination Play-off 1	Warrington Wolves	H	25–12		
	Elimination Semi Final	St Helens	H	40–24		
	Elimination Final	Leeds Rhinos	A	23–22		
18 October 2003	Grand Final	Bradford Bulls	N	12–25		

== Cup run ==
Date	Round	Opponent	H/A	Result	Scorers	Att.
9 February 2003	Fourth Round	Simms Cross	H	92–3		
2 March 2003	Fifth Round	Doncaster Dragons	A	50–10		
16 March 2003	Quarter Final	Swinton Lions	A	70–12		
13 April 2003	Semi Final	Bradford Bulls	H	22–36		
