= Rugby League Charity Shield (Great Britain) =

Rugby league trophy in Britain

Charity Shield
- Sport: Rugby league
- Inaugural season: 1985-86
- Ceased: 1995-96
- Number of teams: 2
- Country: United Kingdom
- Holders: Wigan (1995-96)
- Most titles: Wigan (4 titles)
- Related competition: RFL Championship; Challenge Cup; Premiership

The Rugby League Charity Shield was a trophy for British rugby league clubs that was held as a one-off match at the beginning of a new season. It was modelled on English football's Charity Shield, and was held between 1985 and 1995. Normally the team that had won last season's championship would play the team that currently held the Challenge Cup. In years where the same team won both trophies the following season's Charity Shield was between them and the Premiership winners. In years where one team won all three competitions then the match would be between them and the second placed team in the championship.

The Charity Shield was held at a variety of venues; the Okells Bowl in Douglas on the Isle of Man was used initially with some regularity.

Wigan won the title four times.

== Results ==
Year	Date	Winners	Score	Runner-up	Venue	Attendance
1985–86	25 August 1985	Wigan	34 - 6	Hull Kingston Rovers^{1}	Isle of Man	4,066
1986–87	24 August 1986	Halifax^{1}	9 - 8	Castleford	Isle of Man	3,276
1987–88	23 August 1987	Wigan^{1}	44 - 12	Halifax	Isle of Man	4,757
1988–89	21 August 1988	Widnes^{1}	20 - 14	Wigan	Isle of Man	5,044
1989–90	27 August 1989	Widnes^{1}	27 - 22	Wigan	Anfield, Liverpool	17,263
1990–91	19 August 1990	Widnes^{2}	24 - 8	Wigan^{1}	Vetch Field, Swansea	11,178
1991–92	25 August 1991	Wigan^{1}	22 - 8	Hull^{2}	Gateshead	10,248
1992–93	23 August 1992	St. Helens^{3}	17 - 0	Wigan^{1}	Gateshead	7,364
1993–94	Not played					
1994–95	Not played					
1995–96	13 August 1995	Wigan^{1}	45 - 20	Leeds^{3}	Royal Showground, Dublin	5,716

=== Footnotes ===
1. Denotes that team were previous season's champions
2. Denotes that team were previous season's Premiership winners
3. Denotes that team were previous season's championship runners-up
