= 2002 Challenge Cup =

Rugby league competition

2002 Kellogg's Nutri-Grain Challenge Cup
- Duration: 8 Rounds
- Winners: Wigan Warriors
- Runners-up: St. Helens
- Lance Todd Trophy: Kris Radlinski

The 2002 Challenge Cup was the 101st staging of rugby league's oldest knockout competition, the Challenge Cup. Known as the Kellogg's Nutri-Grain Challenge Cup for sponsorship reason, the final was contested by Wigan Warriors and St. Helens at Murrayfield Stadium in Edinburgh. Wigan won the match 21–12.

== First round ==
Date	Team One	Team Two	Score
01 Dec	Castleford Panthers	Normanton	11-22
01 Dec	Charleston	Wigan St Judes	24-28
01 Dec	Cork	Dewsbury Celtic	18-35
01 Dec	Crosfields	Oulton	10-15
01 Dec	East Leeds	Thornhill	10-22
01 Dec	Eccles	Waterhead	20-10
01 Dec	Edinburgh	Leigh East	10-68
01 Dec	Elland	Shaw Cross	8-6
01 Dec	Hull Dockers	Wath Brow Hornets	15-25
01 Dec	Hunslet Warriors	Sheffield Hills	24-10
01 Dec	Ideal Isberg	Heworth	8-19
01 Dec	Keighley Albion	Eastmoor	10-44
01 Dec	Leeds Met University	Ellenborough	14-32
01 Dec	Milford	Walney	20-4
01 Dec	Millom	Ovenden	12-8
01 Dec	Oldham St Annes	Cott. Phoenix	44-12
01 Dec	RL Lionhearts	Featherstone Lions	10-16
01 Dec	Redhill	Dudley Hill	28-13
01 Dec	RAF	Uni of Wales Inst	40-13
01 Dec	Navy	Farnworth	12-24
01 Dec	Saddleworth	British Army	6-15
01 Dec	Siddal	Simms Cross	10-11
01 Dec	Skirlaugh	Rochdale Mayfield	44-10
01 Dec	Thatto Heath	Ince Rose Bridge	10-6
01 Dec	West Bowling	Newcastle University	20-18
01 Dec	West Hull	Leigh Miners R.	28-8
01 Dec	Westgate Redoubt	Cas. Lock Lane	10-30
01 Dec	Wigan St Pats	Askam	58-22
01 Dec	Woolston	Sharlston Rovers	28-15
01 Dec	York Acorn	Dewsbury Moor	34-32

== Second round ==
Date	Team One	Team Two	Score
15 Dec	Cas. Lock Lane	Eccles	18-2
15 Dec	Dewsbury Celtic	Featherstone Lions	11-10
15 Dec	Eastmoor	Farnworth	8-17
15 Dec	Leigh East	RAF	48-10
15 Dec	Milford	Millom	18-0
15 Dec	Normanton	Ellenborough	6-16
15 Dec	Oldham St Annes	Woolston	10-20
15 Dec	Oulton	Hunslet Warriors	20-14
15 Dec	Redhill	Thornhill	38-16
15 Dec	Simms Cross	British Army	34-10
15 Dec	Skirlaugh	Elland	20-8
15 Dec	West Bowling	Wigan St Pats	12-26
15 Dec	West Hull	Thatto Heath	36-4
15 Dec	Wigan St Judes	Wath Brow Hornets	12-37
15 Dec	York Acorn	Heworth	14-16

== Third round ==
Date	Team One	Team Two	Score
26 Jan	Sheffield Eagles	Leigh East	34-12
27 Jan	Barrow	Oulton	28-5
27 Jan	Batley	Heworth	34-4
27 Jan	Cas. Lock Lane	Doncaster	14-26
27 Jan	Gateshead	Featherstone Rovers	7-23
27 Jan	Huddersfield	Wath Brow Hornets	44-4
27 Jan	Keighley	St Gaudens	0-24
27 Jan	Chorley Lynx	Redhill	10-2
27 Jan	Milford	York	0-42
27 Jan	Oldham	West Hull	38-4
27 Jan	Rochdale Hornets	Farnworth	44-28
27 Jan	Simms Cross	Leigh	12-36
27 Jan	Whitehaven	Dewsbury Celtic	50-0
27 Jan	Wigan St Pats	Dewsbury	4-28
27 Jan	Woolston	Hunslet Hawks	13-18
27 Jan	Workington Town	Toulouse	38-12
30 Jan	Ellenborough	Hull Kingston Rovers	6-38
30 Jan	Swinton	Skirlaugh	32-24

== Fourth round ==
Date	Team One	Team Two	Score
09 Feb	Bradford	Leeds	4-17
09 Feb	Wigan	Hull FC	34-10
10 Feb	Barrow	Warrington	0-10
10 Feb	Batley	London	6-26
10 Feb	Castleford Tigers	Salford City	19-6
10 Feb	Doncaster	Huddersfield	30-10
10 Feb	Featherstone Rovers	Hull Kingston Rovers	24-31
10 Feb	Hunslet Hawks	Workington Town	2-24
10 Feb	Chorley Lynx	UTC	6-20
10 Feb	Oldham	St Helens	6-40
10 Feb	Rochdale Hornets	Leigh	20-24
10 Feb	Saint-Gaudens	Halifax	26-48
10 Feb	York	Villeneuve Leopards	

== Fifth round ==
Date	Team One	Team Two	Score
22 Feb	Leigh Centurions	Whitehaven Warriors	26-23
23 Feb	London Broncos	Castleford Tigers	6-19
23 Feb	Workington Town	Halifax Blue Sox	12-32
24 Feb	Leeds Rhinos	Hull Kingston Rovers	44-4
24 Feb	Union Treiziste Catalane	Wigan Warriors	6-72
24 Feb	Doncaster Dragons	Villeneuve Leopards	24-16
24 Feb	Warrington Wolves	St Helens	14-36
24 Feb	Widnes Vikings	Wakefield Trinity Wildcats	4-12

== Quarter-finals ==
Date	Team One	Team Two	Score
16 Mar	Leigh Centurions	Wigan Warriors	16-30
17 Mar	Castleford Tigers	Doncaster Dragons	32-14
17 Mar	Halifax Blue Sox	St Helens	20-26
17 Mar	Leeds Rhinos	Wakefield Trinity Wildcats	46-10

== Semi finals ==
13 April 2002

Wigan Warriors	20 – 10	Castleford Tigers
Try: Newton, Dallas, Connolly; Goal: Farrell (4)	Report	Try: Smith, Hudson; Goal: Bartrim

Headingley, Leeds
Attendance: 10,380
Referee: Stuart Cummings (Widnes)

14 April 2002

Leeds Rhinos	16 – 42	St. Helens
Try: Calderwood, Walker, Poching; Goal: Walker (2)	Report	Try: Cunningham, Albert (3), Stewart (3), Sculthorpe; Goal: Long (5)

JJB Stadium, Wigan
Attendance: 17,475
Referee: Russell Smith (Castleford)

== Final ==
27 April 2002

Wigan Warriors	21 – 12	St. Helens
Try: Dallas, Lam, Connolly; Goal: Farrell (4); Drop goal: Lam	Report	Try: Albert, Gleeson, Sculthorpe

Murrayfield, Edinburgh
Attendance: 62,140
Referee: Stuart Cummings (Widnes)
Player of the Match: Kris Radlinski

FB	1	Kris Radlinski
RW	2	Brett Dallas
RC	4	Gary Connolly
LC	3	Jamie Ainscough
LW	15	Paul Johnson
SO	6	Julian O'Neill
SH	7	Adrian Lam
PR	8	Terry O'Connor
HK	9	Terry Newton
PR	10	Craig Smith
SR	11	Mick Cassidy
SR	12	David Furner
LF	13	Andy Farrell (c)
Substitutions:
IC	5	Brian Carney
IC	14	David Hodgson
IC	18	Mark Smith
IC	21	Ricky Bibey
Coach:
Stuart Raper

FB	1	Paul Wellens
RW	5	Darren Albert
RC	3	Martin Gleeson
LC	4	Paul Newlove
LW	19	Anthony Stewart
SO	20	Tommy Martyn
SH	7	Sean Long
PR	8	Darren Britt
HK	9	Keiron Cunningham
PR	12	Peter Shiels
SR	11	Chris Joynt
SR	15	Tim Jonkers
LF	13	Paul Sculthorpe (c)
Substitutions:
IC	2	Sean Hoppe
IC	14	John Stankevitch
IC	17	Mick Higham
IC	10	Barry Ward
Coach:
Ian Millward
