= Wigan Warriors =

English rugby league club

Club information
- Full name: Wigan Warriors Rugby League Football Club
- Nickname(s): The Cherry and Whites; The Riversiders
- Colours: Cherry and White
- Founded: 1872; 154 years ago as Wigan Football Club; 1879; 147 years ago (Re-formed) as Wigan Wasps Football Club
- Website: wiganwarriors.com

Current details
- Ground: Brick Community Stadium (25,133)
- CEO: Kris Radlinski
- Chairman: Sir Professor Chris Brookes
- Coach: Matt Peet
- Competition: Super League
- 2026: 1st (Eliminated in Semi-Finals)
- Current season

Uniforms
Home colours

Records
- Championships: 24 (1909, 1922, 1926, 1934, 1946, 1947, 1950, 1952, 1960, 1987, 1990, 1991, 1992, 1993, 1994, 1995, 1996, 1998, 2010, 2013, 2016, 2018, 2023, 2024)
- Challenge Cups: 22 (1924, 1929, 1948, 1951, 1958, 1959, 1965, 1985, 1988, 1989, 1990, 1991, 1992, 1993, 1994, 1995, 2002, 2011, 2013, 2022, 2024, 2026)
- World Club Challenges: 5 (1987, 1991, 1994, 2017, 2024)
- Other honours: 113
- Most capped: 774 – Jim Sullivan
- Highest points scorer: 4,883 – Jim Sullivan

Wigan Warriors Rugby League Football Club is an English professional rugby league club based in Wigan, Greater Manchester, England.

The club competes in the Super League, the top tier of the British rugby league system. Formed in 1872, the club is a founding member of the Northern Rugby Football Union following the schism in 1895. The club is the most successful club in the history of the sport, having won 165 trophies in total (8 of these before the formation of the Northern Rugby Football Union).

The club has played its home games at the Brick Community Stadium since 1999. Before this, the club's home was Central Park, since 1902. The club first wore its now-signature the cherry and white colours in 1885, and adopted these colours on a permanent basis in late 1888.

The club has won 24 league titles (17 first division and 7 Super League), 22 Challenge Cups and 5 World Club Challenges. Wigan's most successful period was during the 1980s and 1990s, with the club winning seven consecutive league titles, eight Challenge Cup finals in a row (1988–1995) and the World Club Challenge three times, including the 14–20 win against Brisbane Broncos at Queensland Sport and Athletics Centre in 1994.

== History ==
=== 1872–1902: Formation, Re-formation and NRFU foundation ===
On 21 November 1872, Wigan Football Club was founded by members of Wigan Cricket Club following a meeting at the Royal Hotel, Standishgate. The meeting saw around 50 members enroll into the club most of whom were members of the cricket club. The following committee was selected: T. R. Ellis, H. V. Kyrke, J. Sayers, E. R. Walker, J. Smith, J. Souter, H. Wall and R. Procter. The recently re-elected Mayor of Wigan Mr Nathan Eckersley was made club president. Many of the club's founding members were well-to-do; including business owners, solicitors and magistrates. Wigan F.C. played on Folly Field, near Upper Dicconson Street and used the nearby Dicconson Arms Hotel as a HQ.

The first match, a practice match where members played against each other, took place on 30 November at Folly Field and attracted around 2,000 spectators. After a series of trial and practice matches, they travelled to Warrington to play their first competitive match on 18 January 1873. The game ended in a draw. The club played six games in its first season finishing with a record of three wins and three draws.

An inability to recruit enough regular and quality players led to many members of Upholland Football Club joining the club in 1876. This was a significant boost to the playing ranks. The club changed its name on 20 October 1876 and became Wigan & District Football Club to represent the new influx of players which had joined from the outskirts of town. The Upholland club disbanded due to the large number of players who joined Wigan. The club moved and played its home games at the Wigan Cricket Club at Prescott Street just off Frog Lane. The first game at Prescott Street was played against St. Helens on 25 November 1876 which Wigan won comfortably. The club did not fulfil all its fixtures in the 1877/78 season. The club played its last match that season against Liverpool Wanderers on 17 November 1877. There are no current records of the club after 23 November 1877 that year as the club disbanded. Many of the members who joined Wigan from Upholland eventually returned to the Upholland club, which was re-formed following the Wigan club being disbanded.

On 22 September 1879, the club was re-formed as Wigan Wasps Football Club by new members at a meeting in the Dicconson Arms. The main instigators of the re-formation of the club anew were W. L. Baldwin, J. Slevin, J. Underwood, Joe Wardle and others. Mr. Underwood was secretary and Mr. Alfred Hodgkinson was named as the treasurer. Many of the new members involved in the re-establishment of the club had also been involved with the Hare & Hounds running club and were of a more working-class background than the cricketers who had originally founded the club. The club moved back to Folly Field and used the Dicconson Arms Hotel as a HQ again before using the Legs of Man Hotel in the town centre as a HQ a few years later.

In 1881 the club reverted to its original name of Wigan Football Club. It had been previously suggested, but Club Secretary William Marsden wished to first send a letter to Wigan Cricket Club as a courtesy, since cricketers had created the original Wigan Football Club. The cricketers were no longer involved with football, and the cricket club secretary responded that the cricketers had no intention of forming another football club with that name, or at all. As such, Wigan Football Club was rechristened with its original name and remained the only rugby football club in the town.

In 1883, Wigan won its first trophy, the Wigan Union Charity Cup. The club won the West Lancashire and Border Towns Union Cup in 1884 and the Wigan Union Charity Cup again in 1885. The club played in cherry and white jerseys for the first time on 26 September 1885. In 1888 they hosted the touring New Zealand Maoris.

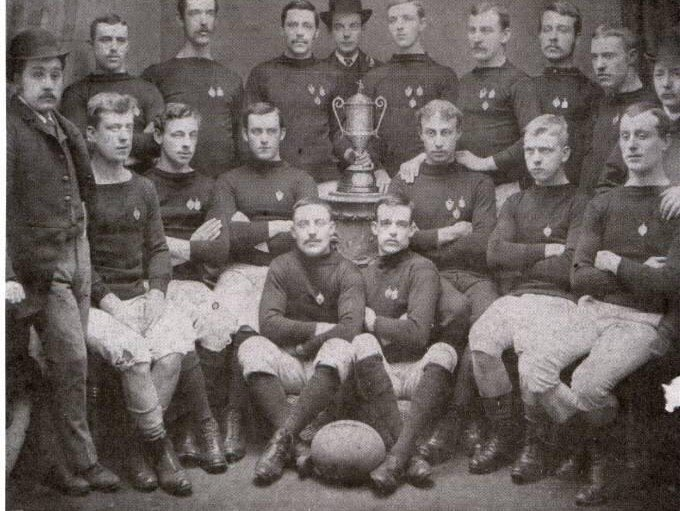
The team of Wigan Football Club in 1885 with the Wigan Union Charity Cup

Notable Wigan players in this period included Ned Bullough, William 'Billy' Atkinson, John 'Jack' Anderton, and most notably James 'Jim' Slevin. Slevin scored 131 tries over his 290 appearances, and the club won 8 trophies during his tenure.

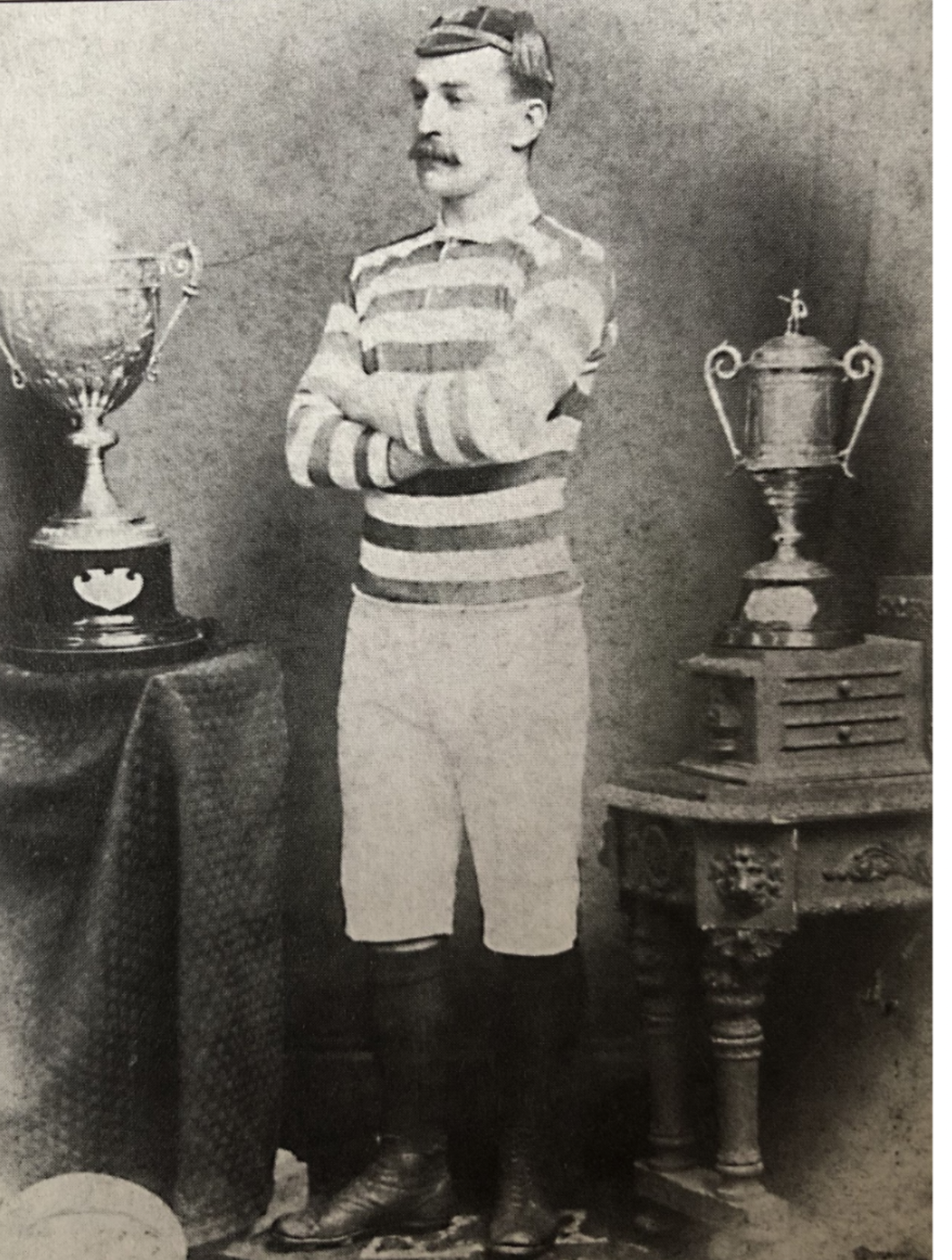
Jim Slevin of Wigan Football Club pictured with the Wigan Union Charity Cup and the West Lancashire and Border Towns Union trophy

Wigan, Leigh and Salford were suspended by the RFU for breaking the strict amateur code despite their argument that broken-time payments were necessary to avoid undue hardship for their working class players. The clubs were placed joint bottom of the Lancashire league. With automatic promotion and relegation, they faced dropping down a division, and potential financial ruin. In 1895 Wigan joined with other clubs from Yorkshire and Lancashire to found the Northern Union which led eventually to the sport of rugby league. This was a result of the breakaway from the Rugby Football Union.

The County Championship was introduced in October 1895 with Cheshire entertaining Lancashire. The Red Rose side contained three players from Wigan: Winstanley (full back) and Unsworth and Brown (forwards).

In 1896–97, due to the increased number of Northern Union teams the Northern League was abandoned in favour of two County Senior leagues. The second half of the season saw the introduction of the Northern Union Cup (later known as the Rugby League Cup). Wigan reached the third round before being knocked out by St. Helens.

In 1904, fourteen clubs resigned from the two county leagues to form a new Northern Rugby League for season 1901–02. Wigan, however, remained in the Lancashire Senior Competition.

Wigan became sub-tenants of Springfield Park, which they shared with Wigan United AFC, playing their first game there on 14 September 1901. A crowd of 4,000 saw them beat Morecambe 12–0. During this season Wigan won the Lancashire Senior Competition.

Wigan's record crowd at Springfield was 10,000 when they beat Widnes on 19 March 1902. The last game was on 28 April 1902 when Wigan beat the Rest of Lancashire Senior Competition. Two meetings were held by Wigan members during the season to discuss the possibility of turning the club into a Limited Company but the idea did not take off.

=== 1902–1945: Move to Central Park and Wartime Emergency League ===
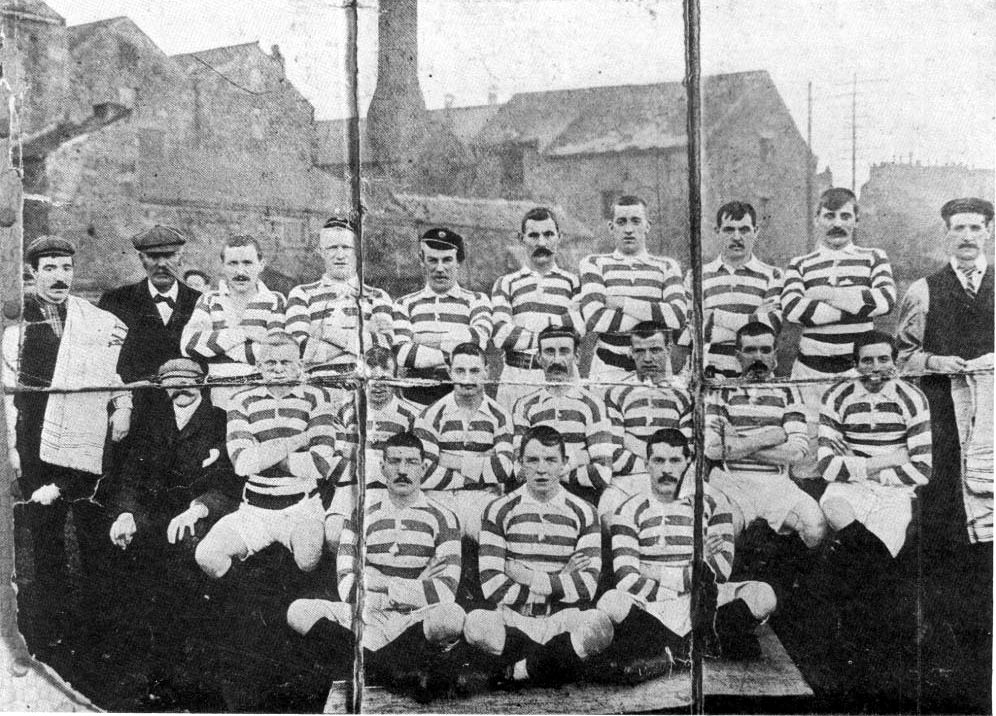
Team of Wigan FC, c. 1900

On 6 September 1902, Wigan played at Central Park for the first time in the opening match of the newly formed First Division. An estimated crowd of 9,000 spectators saw Wigan beat Batley 14–8.

In the 1905–06 season they won their first cup, in rugby league, the Lancashire County Cup. Between 1906 and 1923 Wigan won the Lancashire League another seven times and the Lancashire Cup another four times. Wigan were the first winners of the Lancashire cup.

Wigan played New Zealand on 9 November 1907 and ran out winners by 12 points to 8 in front of a crowd of around 30,000. Great Britain, then known as the Northern Union, played their first-ever test against New Zealand on 25 January 1908. James "Jim" Leytham, Bert Jenkins and John "Johnny" Thomas of Wigan were in the home side and Leytham scored a try. Jenkins and Thomas had previously played in the first Welsh game against New Zealand on 1 January 1908.

On Saturday 28 October 1911, Wigan played a match against the Australasian team which visited England on the 1911–12 Kangaroo tour of Great Britain and won.

On 12 May 1921, Wigan became a limited company.

In June 1922 Jim Sullivan joined Wigan from Cardiff RFC when he was only 17. His cash value was put at £750, which was a staggering signing-on fee for an adolescent who had not yet played 13-a-side rugby (based on increases in average earnings, this would be approximately £137,700 in 2015). His first game was at home against Widnes on 27 August 1921, and he scored ten points in a 21–0 win. Almost inevitably, Jim Sullivan scored the first points in the first Challenge Cup Final to be played at Wembley Stadium, kicking a penalty after only three minutes of the inaugural Challenge Cup Final against Dewsbury in 1929 in which he led Wigan to a 13–2 victory. Sullivan became player-coach in 1932.

Wigan won their first Challenge Cup in the 1923–24 season when they beat Oldham 21–4 in Rochdale.

In 1933 the Prince of Wales attended Central Park, becoming the first royal to watch a rugby league match.

On 25 October 1938 Australian Harry Sunderland arrived in Wigan to take up the duties of Secretary-Manager at Central Park. On 28 September the following year, Sunderland's contract was terminated and he and the club parted company.

The outbreak of World War II disrupted the Rugby Football League Championship but Wigan continued to play in the Lancashire War League and the Emergency War League.

During the war years the club went through the 1940–41 season unbeaten although they lost the Championship final. They lost the 1944 Challenge Cup Final over two games to Bradford Northern 8–3 but made up for it beating Dewsbury in the Championship Final.

=== 1945–1980: Post war era ===
Jim Sullivan's last game, as a player, for Wigan was at Mount Pleasant, Batley, on 23 February 1946. He remained at Central Park for another six seasons as coach.

In 1948 Wigan took part in the first televised rugby league match when their 8–3 Challenge Cup Final victory over Bradford Northern was broadcast to the Midlands. In another first this was the first rugby league match to be attended by the reigning monarch, King George VI, who presented the trophy.

On Saturday 27 October 1951, 33,230 spectators saw Wigan beat Leigh 14–6 in the final of the Lancashire Cup at Station Road, Swinton. In 1952 Wigan won their sixth consecutive Lancashire Cup.

Wigan were also featured in the first league match to be broadcast, a clash with Wakefield Trinity at Central Park on 12 January 1952.

In 1953 Wigan signed Billy Boston for £150. 8,000 fans saw Billy Boston début for Wigan in the 'A' team. He later became one of the most successful and famous Wigan players of all time. Eric Ashton signed for Wigan for £150 in 1955. Wigan went to Wembley six times in the Boston / Ashton era and won three times.

The visit of St. Helens on 27 March 1959 produced Central Park's all-time record attendance of 47,747 which is still a record for any rugby league game in Lancashire. Wigan went on to win the game 19–14 after holding off a Saints comeback. Mick Sullivan moved to Wigan for a then-record £9,500 fee in 1957.

Joe Egan returned to coach Wigan and during his time they won the Championship play-off final in 1960 defeating Wakefield Trinity 21–5, the Challenge Cup in 1958, 1959, 13–9 against Workington Town and 30–13 against Hull F.C. respectively before losing in 12–6 to St. Helens in 1961 which was to be his last game in charge.

Wigan continued to have regular success in both league and cup competitions until 1974, when the club went eight seasons without winning any leagues or cups.

Eric Ashton coached Wigan from 1963 to 1973. In 1966, Wigan locked television cameras out of their ground in the belief that they affected attendances. They were fined £500 by the Rugby Football League. Wigan beat Oldham 16–13 in the 1966 Lancashire Cup Final. Billy Boston played his last match in the cherry and white, against Wakefield Trinity at the end of April 1968.

Wigan celebrated the centenary year of the club in November 1972, with a match against Australia at Central Park, on Saturday 17 November, the result finished as an 18–18 draw.

Wigan pulled off a surprise victory 19–9 over Salford in the Lancashire Cup Final which was played at Wilderspool, Warrington on Saturday 13 October 1973. Cup holders Salford had lost only one match prior to the final, against the touring Australians.

Ted Toohey became coach of Wigan in May 1974 before being sacked in January 1975, beginning a pattern of coaches lasting one or two seasons before being replaced. Star coach Joe Coan then took control until he resigned in September 1976. The board accepted his decision "with reluctance". Vince Karalius then took over but was sacked in September 1979 and was replaced by Kel Coslett.

=== 1980–1996: Relegation, subsequent promotion, and most successful period ===
In 1980, Wigan were relegated from the top flight for the first time in their history and Coslett was replaced by George Fairbairn as player-coach. During the second division season they recorded a record average attendance for the division of 8,198. Wigan won promotion back to the top flight the following season but Fairbairn lasted no longer than May 1981 before moving to Hull Kingston Rovers. Maurice Bamford took over as coach of Wigan before being sacked in May 1982 and was replaced by Alex Murphy.

Maurice Lindsay came to Wigan in the early 1980s to join directors Jack Robinson, Tom Rathbone and ex-player Jack Hilton. Wigan became one of the first teams to go full-time professional in the league, leading to an upsurge in the fortunes of the club.

Between February and October 1987, under new coach, former New Zealand coach Graham Lowe, Wigan won a record 29 games in a row as follows: 20 Division One matches, 3 Premiership Trophy matches, 4 Lancashire Cup matches, 1 Charity Shield final, 1 World Club Challenge Final. Wigan defeated Australian club Manly-Warringah 8–2 in front of a crowd of 36,895 at Central Park for an unofficial World Club Championship (though many who were at Central Park still claim the attendance was closer to 50,000). It was the first time an English club side had beaten a team of Australians at rugby league since the 1978 Kangaroo tour. After Lowe left in 1989, Australian John Monie, a former premiership winning coach with the Parramatta Eels, continued the success at Central Park. From 1988 to 1995 Wigan won the Challenge Cup 8 seasons in a row including their 27–0 win over St Helens in 1989, the first time any team had been held scoreless in a Cup Final at Wembley; this period was Wigan's most successful period to date. They also won the Championship seven times, League Cup four times, Premiership Trophy three times, Charity Shield twice and three World Club Championships.

In February 1990, Wigan announced a record £280,000 profit but by 1993 this had become a loss of £300,000 on a turnover of £3 million, attributed in part to the cost of the Whitbread Stand that had been built at the clubhouse end of Central Park in 1991–92 at an estimated cost of £1.3 million. By March 1994, Wigan's wage bill topped £2 million a year.

John Dorahy became coach for the 1993 season. Despite supervising Wigan through to the Challenge Cup and the Rugby Football League Championship, Dorahy was dismissed in May 1994, only days after the club's return from Wembley. In a statement by the club, Dorahy was said to have been sacked for "gross misconduct". Graeme West was appointed as coach, after fans petitioned for him to get the job.

In his first month as coach, at the end of the 1993–94 Rugby Football League season West secured the First Division Premiership Trophy against Castleford, and then traveled with the team to Brisbane, guiding them in their 1994 World Club Challenge victory over Australian premiers, the Brisbane Broncos in front of a WCC record attendance of 54,220. At the end of his first full season, he and the team won the League Championship, Challenge Cup, Regal Trophy, and Premiership—the 'Grand Slam' of all 4 trophies. Even though Wigan dominated rugby league from 1985 to 1995, it was the only season the club achieved this feat. This would be somewhat surpassed in 2024, with Wigan winning all 4 trophies available to them in the same season: the World Club Challenge, Challenge Cup, League Leaders Shield and Super League Grand Final.

=== 1996–present: Summer era rugby ===
Wigan played in a special 2 match challenge series against Bath RFC in 1996, with one game played under league rules, and the other under union rules. Wigan won the league game 82–6 at Maine Road, but lost the return union game 44–19 at Twickenham.

In July 1996 Andy Farrell was named the Wigan club's captain. Farrell enjoyed a fantastic 1996 and was rewarded with the Man of Steel Award.

Eric Hughes became coach of Wigan Warriors, replacing Graeme West in February 1997 following an early exit from the Challenge Cup in 2 consecutive years. In 1997 the club was renamed as the Wigan Warriors. Wigan's dominance came under threat with the new league now fully professional and the introduction of the salary cap and the 20/20 rule. After going out of the Challenge Cup to Salford in 1996 and St Helens in 1997, they returned to Wembley for the final time in 1998. Wigan were still undefeated in the league and coach John Monie—in his second spell at Wigan—had never lost a cup tie meant Wigan were huge favourites in their 2 May 1998 match against the Sheffield Eagles. However, in one the biggest upsets in rugby league history, the Eagles pulled off a 17–8 win.

Wigan won the Minor Premiership and the first Super League Grand Final in 1998 with a 10–4 victory over Leeds at Old Trafford, Manchester.

In November 1999, coach Andy Goodway was sacked by Wigan chairman Maurice Lindsay after the Warriors' failure to win a trophy for the first time in 15 years. After a buy-out by Dave Whelan, both the Warriors and the town's football team, Wigan Athletic, moved to the JJB Stadium. As part of the rugby league's "on the road" scheme, Wigan met Gateshead Thunder at Tynecastle, Edinburgh. Maurice Lindsay also returned as director. On an emotional day of high drama Wigan's final game at Central Park was against arch rivals St Helens on Sunday 5 September 1999. Wigan legend Ellery Hanley returned as St Helens coach but a Jason Robinson virtuoso try meant the game was won by Wigan 28–20. The first game at the new stadium was a defeat in a Super League play-off match against Castleford on 19 September 1999.

Frank Endacott joined Wigan as head coach after the 1999 season and in 2000 Wigan finished top of the Super League and reached the Grand Final for the second time but were beaten 29–16 by St Helens. Endacott was sacked in 2001 following a string of poor results and was replaced by Australian Stuart Raper. Raper guided Wigan to the 2001 Super League Grand Final but were well beaten by Bradford Bulls, 37–6. That year Andy Farrell also set a new club record for points in a season with 429.

However, the following season Raper guided Wigan to their 17th Challenge Cup, defeating St Helens 21–12 at Murrayfield Stadium, 7 years after previously lifting the trophy. Wigan's Kris Radlinski inspired the side with a player-of-the-match performance against the much-fancied Saints to claim the Lance Todd Trophy despite being in hospital the previous week with a foot infection.

Stuart Raper was sacked in July 2003 and was replaced by assistant coach Mike Gregory – Gregory oversaw an improvement and led the Warriors to a third place finish as Wigan became the first team from outside of the top-two to reach the Grand Final. However, Wigan fell short on the night and were defeated by Bradford Bulls 25–12.

In 2004 Gregory guided Wigan to the Challenge Cup final at the Millennium Stadium in Cardiff but Wigan could not repeat their 2002 feat and were beaten 32–16. This defeat was Gregory's final match as head coach of Wigan, as he travelled to the United States to receive treatment for an illness he contracted after an insect bite whilst in Australia. It later emerged that Gregory was suffering with Motor Neurone Disease and he did not return as Wigan coach.

Denis Betts took over as Wigan Head Coach, leading Wigan to a fourth place finish in 2004. Despite play-off victories against St Helens and Wakefield Trinity Wildcats, Wigan missed out on the 2004 Grand Final, losing to Leeds Rhinos in the Final Eliminator. Betts was later demoted to assistant coach and replaced as head coach by former St Helens boss Ian Millward. However, Millward's tenure was not a successful period and included embarrassing defeats to Leeds Rhinos and St Helens 70–0 and 75–0 respectively.

After a stellar season played largely at prop forward, Wigan captain Andy Farrell was named Man of Steel for the second time. In March 2005, Farrell signed for Rugby Union side Saracens. He was replaced as captain by Kris Radlinski. Wigan's form in early 2005 was inconsistent, but they did defeat St Helens in the traditional Good Friday Derby 22–20 in front of a record crowd of 25,004.

2006 proved to be another tough year for Wigan with Ian Millward being sacked following a run of one win in eight games which saw the club face a genuine threat of relegation. The Australian was replaced by Bradford Bulls and Great Britain coach Brian Noble. Despite a points deduction following a breach of the salary cap, the side rallied under Noble and eventually finished in 8th position just outside the play-offs.

In early 2006, club captain Kris Radlinski retired from playing owing to persistent injuries. Despite later coming out of retirement in an attempt to help the club avoid relegation, Radlinski was replaced as skipper by 23 year-old loose forward Sean O'Loughlin.

Wigan improved in 2007, inspired by the acquisition of Australian stand-off Trent Barrett and appeared set for a first appearance in the play-offs since 2004, however, this was placed under threat following another points deduction – taking the team from 4th to 9th place. Wigan also reached the Challenge Cup Semi Finals in 2007 but were defeated by Catalans Dragons. Following the points deduction and semi final defeat, Wigan Chairman Maurice Lindsay announced that he would stepping down from his role at the end of the campaign.

The Warriors recovered from a difficult mid-season to finish sixth in the regular season and qualify for the play-offs. In this play-off campaign, Wigan overturned a 30–6 deficit to defeat Bradford Bulls 30–31 in a match widely regarded as the greatest comeback in Super League history. The following week, Wigan defeated Hull FC 18–21 to set up a play-off eliminator with Leeds Rhinos. Unfortunately for Wigan, this proved one game too far and the Warriors were defeated 36–6.

At the end of the 2007 season, it was announced that Harlequins owner Ian Lenagan had purchased an 89% stake in the club.

The 2008 Super League season saw Wigan finish in fourth place – a best finish since 2004. However, the club again fell short of the Grand Final, losing 18–14 to Leeds Rhinos.

Wigan initially struggled in the 2009 Super League season and suffered an embarrassing defeat to winless Celtic Crusaders. Wigan again reached the Challenge Cup semi-final and play off final eliminator, but were defeated by Warrington Wolves and St Helens respectively.

Despite leading Wigan to five semi-finals in three seasons, Brian Noble's contract as head coach was not renewed at the close of the 2009 season. Noble is credited with stabilising the Warriors following a tumultuous 2005 and 2006.

Noble was replaced by Melbourne Storm assistant coach Michael Maguire who was appointed as the new head coach ahead of the 2010 season. One of Maguire's first actions was to implement a 'leadership group' in which several players would join Sean O'Loughlin as captain on a match-by-match basis.

Despite only making one major close-season signing, the upturn in Wigan's fortune under Maguire was immediate – opening the campaign with a comprehensive 38–6 win at home to Crusaders. Maguire also led the Warriors to their maiden victory at Warrington's Halliwell Jones Stadium, where the club had not won since its opening in 2003. Further success followed when Wigan defeated St Helens 10–18 in the traditional Good Friday fixture. This was Wigan's first Easter victory over Saints since 2005 and meant Wigan won the final meeting between the clubs at Knowsley Road. Wigan finished the season in top spot for the first time since 2000 and claimed the League Leaders Shield. Following victories over Hull Kingston Rovers and Leeds Rhinos in the Super League play-offs, Wigan reached the Grand Final for the first time since 2003. Wigan went on to defeat rivals St Helens St Helens 22–10 at Old Trafford in front of 71,526 spectators – the club's first league championship since 1998 and 19th in total. The club also swept the boards at the annual Man of Steel Awards, with Sam Tomkins winning young player of the year, Michael Maguire claiming coach of the year, winger Pat Richards taking the Man of Steel award whilst the club was named club of the year.

Victory meant that Wigan qualified for the 2011 World Club Challenge in which they were defeated 15–21 by Australian premiers St George Illawarra Dragons. Ahead of the 2011 campaign, the leadership group was dropped and Sean O'Loughlin returned as sole captain – a position he would retain until his retirement in 2020.

2011 was another successful year for Wigan with the club reaching their first Challenge Cup Final for seven years, defeating Leeds Rhinos 28–18. Victory marked Wigan's first Challenge Cup victory since 2002 and a first victory at Wembley Stadium since 1995. However, Wigan could not retain their Super League crown, losing in the play-offs to St Helens.

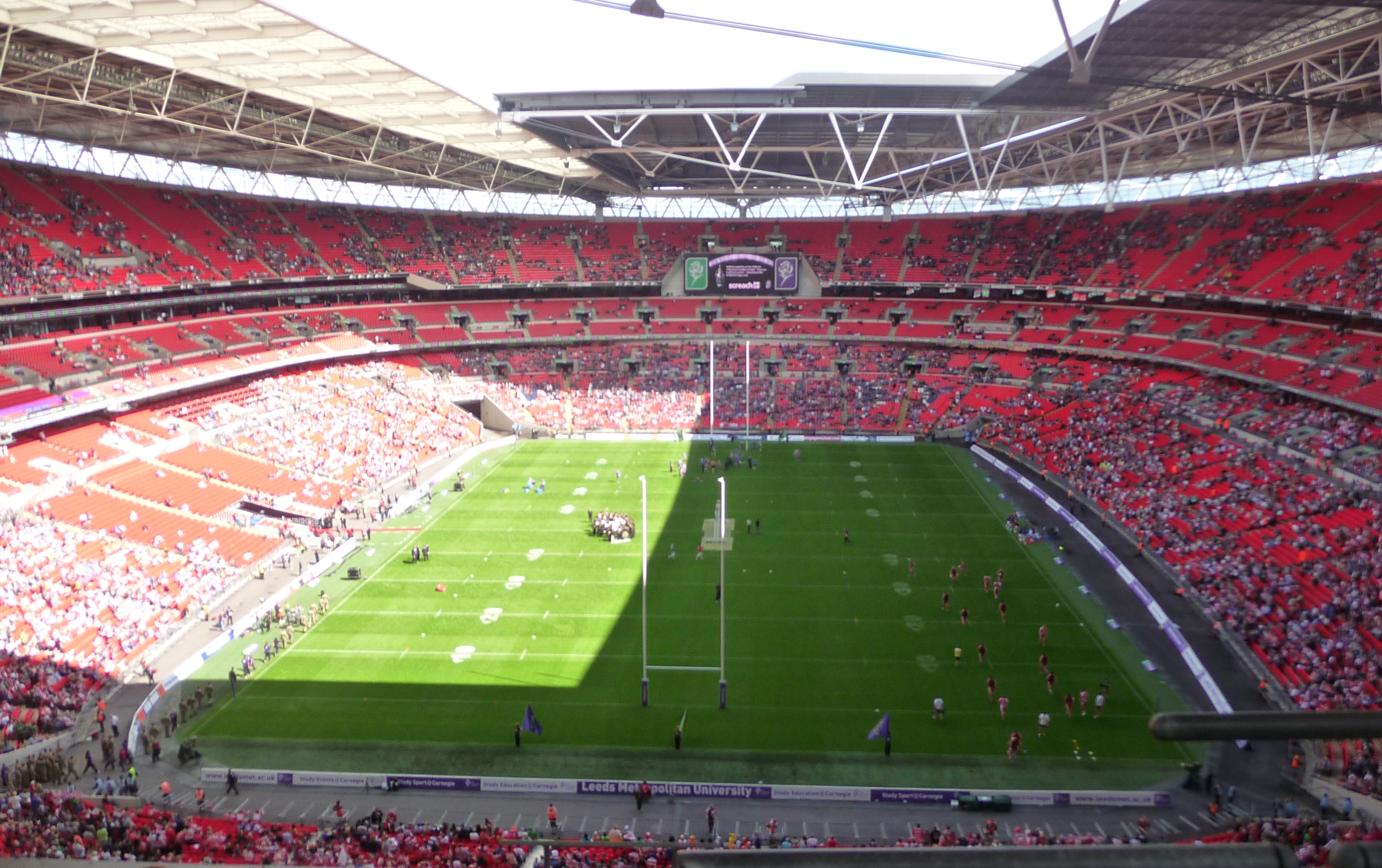
Wigan Warriors at Wembley ahead of the 2011 Challenge Cup Final

Following the conclusion of the 2011 season, Michael Maguire left his position to return to Australia to coach South Sydney Rabbitohs. Maguire is credited with returning the Warriors to the top table of British Rugby League after a difficult decade. Maguire was replaced as head coach by his assistant Shaun Wane.

Wane's debut season started poorly with a 16–20 defeat at home to Huddersfield Giants. However, Wigan's form soon recovered, with Wane claiming victory in that season's Good Friday Derby, defeating St Helens 10–28 in the first derby to take place at Langtree Park. Wigan also went on a 10-game winning streak which included thrashings of Saints at Magic Weekend and Leeds Rhinos at Headingley Stadium. Wane guided the Warriors to a first-placed finish and claimed the League Leaders Shield, but was unable to reach either the Challenge Cup Final or Grand Final – falling to Leeds Rhinos in the semi-finals of both competitions.

Warriors full-back Sam Tomkins was named 2012 Steve Prescott Man of Steel.

Expectations were varied ahead of the 2013 campaign, with the Warriors having lost several key players. However, it turned out to a be a memorable year for club. Wigan firstly claimed a 19th Challenge Cup victory, defeating Hull FC 16–0 at Wembley Stadium. Wigan then righted the wrongs of 2011 and 2012 in reaching the Grand Final – the Warriors recovered from a 16–2 deficit to defeat Warrington Wolves 16–30 and claimed a 20th league title and a League and Cup double – the club's first since 1995.

Following victory in the Grand Final, Wigan broke with custom and travelled to Australia to contest the 2014 World Club Challenge, but were defeated 36–14 by the Sydney Roosters.

The Warriors finished in second place in 2014 and reached the Grand Final where they were defeated 14–6 by St Helens in a game that was overshadowed by prop forward Ben Flower's red card for a brutal double punch on Saints halfback Lance Hohaia. The Warriors were also knocked out of the Challenge Cup at the quarter-final stage by Castleford Tigers.

Wigan again finished in second place in 2015 and reached an eighth Grand Final. However, they were again defeated – losing 22–20 to Leeds Rhinos in front of a record crowd of 73,512. Wigan suffered a shock early exit in the Challenge Cup – losing to Hull Kingston Rovers in the sixth round.

Wigan fared better in 2016. The club reached the semi-finals of the Challenge Cup, losing to Hull FC and recorded a third successive second-placed finish and a fourth straight Grand Final appearance. However, the Warriors were able to put the disappointment of the previous two years behind them and defeated Warrington Wolves 6–12. Victory marked Wigan's fourth Super League title, and 21st Championship in total.

2017 was a mixed season for Wigan. The club claimed a record-extending fourth 2017 World Club Challenge victory with a win over Cronulla Sharks, 22–6. However, Wigan's form dropped and in mid-season, the side went eight Super League matches without a win. The Warriors finished the season in sixth place, missing out on the play-offs for the first time since 2006. Wigan also lost out in the Challenge Cup Final, where they were defeated 18–14 by Hull FC at Wembley Stadium.

2018 was a brighter year for Wigan. The year began with a trip to Australia in Round 2 to play Hull FC in the first-ever Super League game to be played outside of Europe. Wigan were victorious at WIN Stadium, defeating Hull FC 24–10. At the Super 8s stage of the season, Wigan won an unprecedented 7 out of 7 matches including revenge for the Good Friday defeat by soundly beating arch rivals St Helens 10–30 at the Totally Wicked Stadium. Wigan reached a sixth Grand Final in nine years with a 14–0 play-off victory against Castleford Tigers where they again faced Warrington Wolves. Two tries from winger Dom Manfredi helped the Warriors to a 12–4 win in front of 64,892. This was the club's fifth Grand Final win taking the overall total of League Championships the club has won to 22. Victory also avenged the Warriors exit from the Challenge Cup at the hands of the Wolves back in June.

In August 2018 it was announced that Shaun Wane would leave his position as head coach at the end of the 2018 season. Wane would be replaced by former Wigan half back Adrian Lam for the 2019 season, whilst club legend Shaun Edwards would return from Rugby Union to lead the side from 2020 onwards.

Victory in the Grand Final turned out to be Wane's last act as head coach – he left the role having won three Grand Finals, a Challenge Cup, a League Leaders Shield, and a World Club Challenge, making him the most successful Wigan coach of the summer era. He is credited with maintaining the club's status as a Rugby League powerhouse with an emphasis on homegrown talent.

As a result of victory in the Grand Final, one of Lam's first games as head coach would be the World Club Challenge where the Warriors again faced Sydney Roosters. Unfortunately Wigan were unable to avenge the 2014 defeat and went down 8–20 in front of 21,331 at the DW Stadium.

In April 2019 it was announced that Shaun Edwards would not be taking up his role as head coach from 2020 onwards. Lam's contract was later extended to 2020 and 2021 In May 2019, Wigan travelled to Barcelona to face Catalans Dragons at the iconic Nou Camp but were beaten 33–16. Despite a poor start to 2019, Wigan finished the regular season in second place, but suffered a shock defeat in the play-offs against Salford Red Devils, losing 4–28 at the DW Stadium to miss out on the Grand Final.

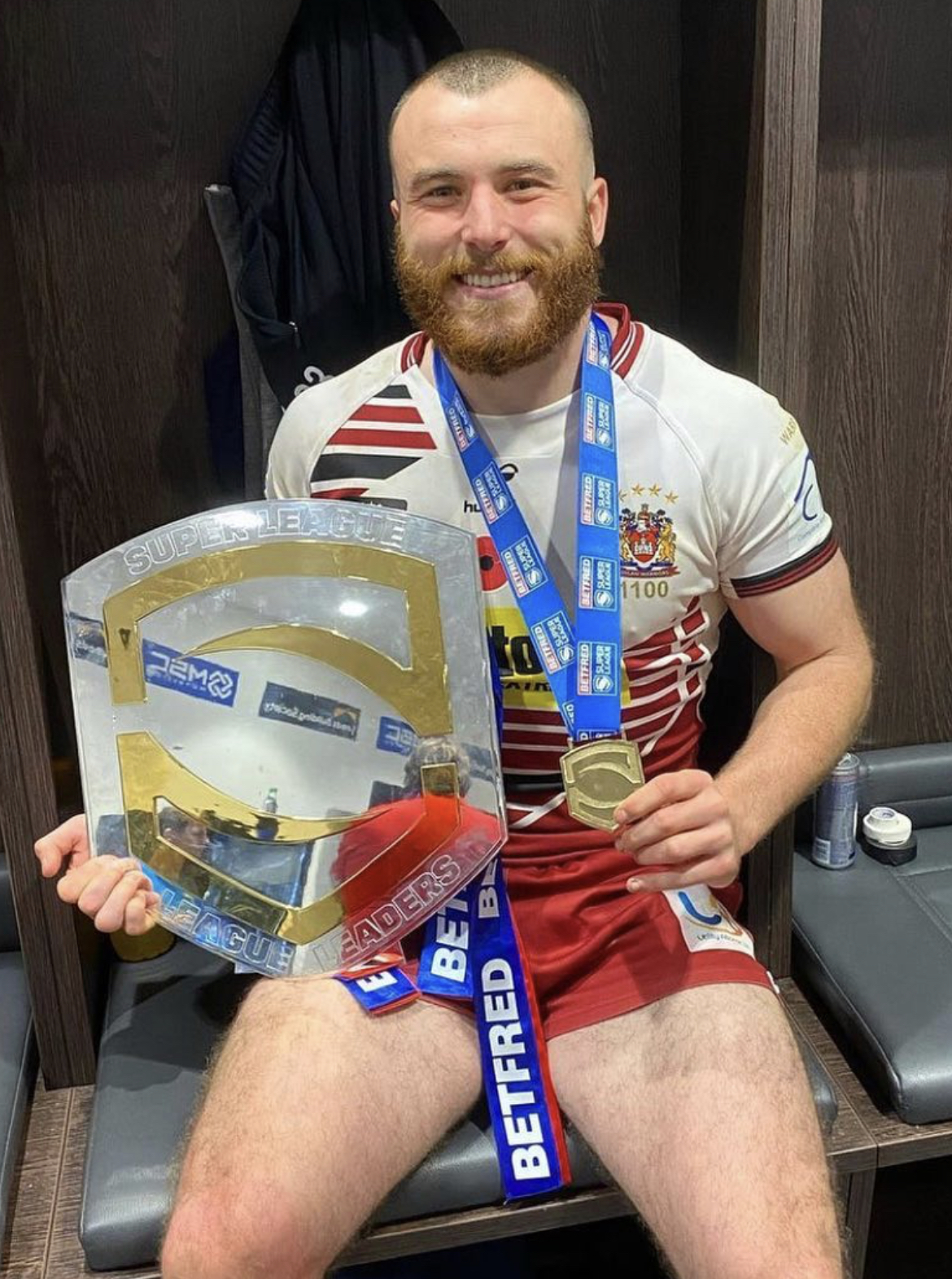
Wigan's 2020 signing Jake Bibby celebrating winning that season's League Leaders' Shield

The 2020 Super League season was interrupted by the COVID-19 pandemic and a points-percentage system was implemented to account for the varying number of matches each team played. The Warriors claimed the League Leaders Shield and reached the Grand Final which was played at the KCOM Stadium in Hull. The final turned out to be one of the most dramatic in history – with scores tied at 4–4 and with ten seconds remaining, St Helens player Jack Welsby touched down to win the game 4–8.

The match was club legend Sean O'Loughlin's last appearance for Wigan who retired aged 38. O'Loughlin was replaced as skipper for the 2021 season by Thomas Leuluai.

In the 2021 Super League season, Wigan endured a difficult campaign finishing in 4th place on the table. After winning their first five games of the campaign, the Warriors were knocked out of the Challenge Cup by Hull FC. Throughout the season, Wigan's attack struggled to spark and the club suffered a defeat at home to St Helens in which they did not score a try. Five days later the club were defeated 0–14 at home by Leeds Rhinos – the first time the Warriors had been nilled at home in the Super League era. In August 2021 it was announced that Adrian Lam would leave his position as head coach at the end of the season. Lam's final game was the elimination play-off match against Leeds Rhinos, in which the Warriors were again held scoreless at home, losing 0–8.

Supporters are divided on Lam's tenure as Wigan coach. His detractors argue that he failed to deliver on his promise to play 'flamboyant' rugby and that he had a poor record in important games. However, his defenders comment that he was hamstrung by the fall-out from the COVID-19 pandemic and from the confusion over whether Shaun Edwards would take up his role in 2020. It is also pointed out that Wigan were the only team to participate in 25 games in 2021, including many that took place midweek.

On 5 October 2021, Matt Peet was named as Wigan Head Coach with Shaun Wane returning in a director role. Sean O'Loughlin and Lee Briers also joined the coaching staff.

Peet oversaw an immediate improvement in the club's form and reached the Challenge Cup Final, held at the Tottenham Hotspur Stadium. In a tight game, a late try from Warriors winger Liam Marshall claimed a 16–14 victory and a 20th Challenge Cup for Wigan. On 15 July 2022, Wigan's Bevan French broke the individual record for tries in a Super League game, touching down seven times in a 60–0 win at home to Hull FC. Wigan finished the 2022 Super League season in second place on the table and were favourites to reach the Grand Final. However, the club suffered a shock 8–20 loss to Leeds in the semi-final which denied them a place in the decider.

Wigan captain Thomas Leuluai retired at the end of the season and was replaced as skipper by second-row forward Liam Farrell.

In 2023 Wigan were unable to retain the Challenge Cup losing in the semi-finals to Hull Kingston Rovers in golden-point extra time. However, following this defeat Wigan did not lose another game all season, in a 10-game winning streak that included a 0–50 hammering of Leeds Rhinos. Wigan claimed the League Leaders Shield and exacted revenge on Hull KR in the play-off semi finals, defeating the Robins 42–12 to set up a Grand Final with Catalans Dragons. In the Grand Final, the Warriors overcame the Dragons 10–2 to claim a sixth Super League title and a 23rd championship in total.

Bevan French was named Steve Prescott Man of Steel for 2023.

On 15 July 2023, it was announced that Warriors chairman Ian Lenagan would step down as Chairman and Shareholder on 30 November 2023, with his shares being sold to Mike Danson. Chris Brookes would replace Lenagan as chairman.

Lenagan's stewardship of the club is perceived by supporters as having restored the Warriors to their rightful place as one of the country's elite rugby league clubs. During his sixteen years at the club, Wigan won 6 Super League titles, 3 Challenge Cups, 4 League Leaders Shields, and a World Club Challenge.

The 2024 season proved even more successful for the Wigan club and on 24 February 2024, the Warriors defeated Australian premiers Penrith Panthers in the World Club Challenge to claim a record-extending fifth title. Following victories over Sheffield Eagles, Castleford Tigers and Hull Kingston Rovers, the Warriors reached the Challenge Cup Final where they defeated Warrington Wolves 18–8 at Wembley to take their cup tally to 21. Final success meant that Wigan held all four major trophies simultaneously – the first time this had occurred since 2007. Later in 2024, Wigan retained the League Leaders Shield, topping the table in back-to-back seasons for the first time in the summer era. Following a 38–0 semi-final victory against Leigh Leopards, Wigan reached the Grand Final where they defeated Hull Kingston Rovers 9–2 in a low-scoring affair. Wigan's Bevan French scored the only try of the game and was awarded the inaugural Rob Burrow Award as player of the match – this was following the renaming of the award from the Harry Sunderland Trophy.

Victory marked the Warriors winning back-to-back Grand Finals for the first time, whilst also completing a ‘Quadruple’ or 'Grand Slam', claiming the World Club Challenge, the League Leaders Shield, the Challenge Cup, and the Super League Grand Final in a calendar year – the first time such a feat had been achieved in the summer era and Wigan's first Quadruple since 1994.

The win secured Wigan's qualification for the 2025 World Club Challenge against NRL premiers Penrith Panthers in a rematch of the 2024 fixture. However, owing to each side's pre-arranged fixture commitments, it proved difficult to find a date for the fixture. In an October Instagram post, Panthers halfback Nathan Cleary expressed a desire for the fixture to take place at the NRL's Magic Round. Warriors CEO Kris Radlinski also stated that he would seek to play the fixture "at any costs", but the release of the 2025 Super League fixtures in November 2024 indicated that the fixture would not be taking place.

Wigan started the 2025 Super League season with a 0–1 defeat in golden point extra time to Leigh Leopards, but recovered to defeat Warrington Wolves in a stellar performance at Allegiant Stadium, Las Vegas. The Warriors' defence of the Challenge Cup was ended by a shock 22–26 defeat at home to Hull FC. Wigan would eventually reach the 2025 Super League Grand Final as they searched for a third consecutive championship but were defeated 24–6 by Hull Kingston Rovers.

Wigan started their 2026 season with 5 straight wins in Super League and wins against Rochdale Hornets and Bradford Bulls in the Challenge Cup. However, Wigan's form took a nosedive in April, with the club suffering four successive league defeats. Despite this patchy form, the Warriors managed to reach the Challenge Cup Final, defeating Wakefield Trinity and St Helens in the quarter-finals and semi-finals respectively. Despite pundits and bookmakers expecting a tight encounter, the Warriors romped to a 40-10 victory against Hull Kingston Rovers to claim a record-extending 22nd Challenge Cup crown. The 30-point margin was also the biggest Challenge Cup Final win in Wigan's history. 20 year-old half-back Jack Farrimond produced a player-of-the-match performance to claim the Lance Todd Trophy.

In the Super League era, Wigan have won seven Super League titles, six Challenge Cups, two World Club Challenges, and five League Leaders Shields. The majority of this success came between 2010 and 2023, during the 'Lenagan years'.

== Name ==
The club started out life as Wigan Football Club (stylised as Wigan FC) in 1872. When the club was re-formed in 1879, the club's name was Wigan Wasps Football Club. "Wasps" was dropped from the club's name in 1881 and the club's name was again Wigan Football Club (stylised as Wigan FC). As Northern Union evolved into Rugby League, Wigan would officially become Wigan Rugby League Football Club (stylised as Wigan RLFC) or officially written as Wigan Rugby League (stylised as Wigan RL) this being a shorter written version of the former rather than a name change.

Following a number of Super League clubs, such as Bradford Bulls and Warrington Wolves, who changed their names to be marketable to new audiences, Wigan added Warriors to their name for the start of the 1997 season. The club was and still is commonly referred to simply as Wigan.

== Colours ==
The colours cherry and white are the most synonymous with the club. The home kits have mostly consisted of the colours cherry and white since 1888 in different variations, usually hoops, but not always. The Wigan team first played in cherry and white jerseys on 19 September 1885 in a match against Bury. The club did not settle on the colours until 22 December 1888 when after this time there is no mention of Wigan deviating from these colours as the primary colours. It is known that the team did wear a variety of different-coloured jerseys at different times before 19 September 1885 and in-between that date and 22 December 1888. These included; blue and white hooped jerseys, black jerseys with white shorts and black socks, white jerseys, white-and-coral hooped jerseys and a chocolate-and-coral hooped jersey with black socks. The white Maltese cross was added to the club's jerseys for the start of the 1884–85 season but how long this remained as a feature on the jersey is unknown. The white jerseys were worn on several occasions during the 1885 season and were also worn at least once during 1887. The chocolate-and-coral hooped jerseys were worn during the 1886–1887 season with black socks, however, the colour of the shorts which were worn is unknown. It is also unknown how many times Wigan turned out in the chocolate-and-coral jersey that year.

With some brief interludes, the club spent the majority of the 20th century wearing regular cherry and white hooped jerseys with white shorts.

From the late 1980s onwards shirt designs became more varied, but remained largely variations on cherry and white hoops. However, the club started to experiment with wearing red shorts as opposed to white.

From roughly 2015-onwards, the version of 'cherry' red featured on Warriors home shirts has been a much darker shade of red. From the late 1980s to the late 1990s, Wigan's away kit was usually royal blue and white hoops, with the template often being the exact same as the home kit, but in alternative colours. In the 21st century, royal blue and white away jerseys have made brief returns, notably in 2005 and 2016.

From 2022-onwards, Wigan's third kit was a design inspired by their charity partners and a percentage of proceeds from sales would be donated to the respective charity. They have partnered with charities like The Brick and Wigan And Leigh Hospice.

Wigan released their kits for 2025 in November 2024. The home shirt features the traditional cherry and white hoops complete with black and gold trim whilst the shorts and stockings are both cherry red. The away kit is all navy blue with 'electric blue' flashes across the front. The Warriors revealed their charity third kit on 23 November 2024 – an all-lilac kit in partnership with Wigan & Leigh Hospice, a local charity that helped Warriors winger Liam Marshall's mother Debbie, who died in February 2024.

== Club crest ==
Wigan have used a variation of the coat of arms (which was granted to the Borough of Wigan on 8 April 1922) as the club crest for a large part of the club's history. The club first used the crest on the playing jerseys for the 1948 Challenge Cup Final against Bradford. The crest appeared on the jersey in other future cup finals but would not become a permanent feature on the playing jerseys until 1984.

Wigan have used a variation of this coat of arms as the club crest for a large part of the club's history.

Below are further details on the Club Crest:

Excerpts from an Article, by Mr. Arthur J. Hawkes, Chief Librarian.

Possessing a series of town seals from the twelfth century onwards, Wigan, at the opening of the twentieth century still remained without "ensigns proper to its order."

Wigan is one of the oldest boroughs in England (third oldest in Lancashire after Liverpool and Salford). Town liberties or borough rights existed in England in Anglo-Saxon times, several centuries before the Norman Conquest. Places like London, York, Winchester, Norwich, etc., are known from records to have exercised these privileges, and it may properly be inferred that Wigan also enjoyed them. Finally, we have the report of the Norry King of Arms in 1613 that "the towne and bourrough of Wiggin was antiently Incorporated by the most noble Kinge, Kinge Hen, the first in the first yeare of his raygne" (i.e., 1100)—a certified copy of which document is now in the Public Library. Under William the Conqueror, the borough privileges were restricted, but on the accession of Henry I they were largely restored by virtue of his great coronation charter of liberties. The liberties of individual towns were restored or confirmed by special charter, some of which are extant. If we can rely upon the report of the Herald in 1613, Wigan was one of the first boroughs to be so restored. Following this we have a long series of royal charters, mostly still extant, some containing special marks of royal favour, which charters will be detailed in the next number.

This version of the club crest was used between 2006 and 2017.

J. Paul Rylands describes the coat above as "perhaps the very best of all Lancashire town arms, for it might, heraldically, belong to the Middle Ages, and is indeed symbolic of antiquity and loyalty." It is certainly a very privileged coat of arms, as few if any coats bear so many symbols of royal favour. Indeed, the incorporation of royal insignia into armorial bearings is jealously guarded and usually proscribed by the court officials. In Wigan's new grant there are (1) A king's Head, crowned, (2) the Royal "Leopard" (or "lion couchant guardant"), (3) a mediaeval royal crown, and (4) the supporting lions. The king's head in the crest officially represents no particular king, in the words of the Rouge Croix herald (in whose hands the design took shape) it is intended "to be a conventional likeness to an early English Monarch." It is actually modelled on the portrait of King Edward III, but from the point of view of the town it symbolises especially King Henry I. On Wigan's earliest town seal—probably the 12th century—there appears to be a towered or castellated gateway over the centre of which is depicted what seems to be the crowned head of Henry I. These devices therefore, are taken as the chief symbols of the new bearings, the towered gateway becomes a Norman castle and the king's head becomes a crest—indicating Wigan as a town of consequence and royal patronage at the opening of the twelfth century. The royal lion, again, marks another important period in Wigan history. Edward III, by a charter of 1350, granted Wigan the right (with several other towns) to use a royal seal known as the "King's Recognisance Seal," on which was figured the king's head and the royal lion. The Somerset Herald expressed the opinion that as none of the other towns had made use of the king's permission by adopting the figures in their arms, Wigan could with propriety include them, and his view prevailed with the Chapter of Heralds.

Supporters are nowadays usually granted only to the great cities, but Wigan's ancient importance has been thereby recognised, the lions giving the distinction to a highly dignified and privileged coat of arms. There is a final feature of unusual interest. The branches of the mountain ash held in the lion's paws add something to the conventional "mantling" or flowered scrolls which usually ornament armorial bearings. The design of the floriation is usually a matter for the artist and without heraldic significance. But in the case of Wigan's arms, the mountain ash, known in the northern dialects as the Wiggin or Wigan Tree, forms a "rebus" or pun on the name of the town, and has the advantage of giving further symbolism to an already significant coat. The rebus has tradition behind it, for the Wiggin Tree is a conspicuous feature of several of the town's mediaeval seals.

The motto adopted "Ancient and Loyal" is in keeping with the arms. For a great many years Wigan has on all occasions, official and unofficial, invariably referred to itself as the "Ancient and Loyal Borough," but few are aware that authority for its use can be found in the charter of Charles II, the governing charter of the town until the Municipal Corporations Act 1835. In that charter Wigan is designated by the king "an ancient borough" and granted a "special token of our favour for its loyalty to us," so that nothing could be more fitting than its adoption as the town's motto.

Wigan Warriors Club Crest used from 1 November 2020

On 1 November 2020, the club changed its crest to a new design. The club drew inspiration for the Warrior design element of the badge from the Brigantes who were Celtic Britons and controlled a large part of Northern England, including Wigan, in pre-Roman times. The name Brigantes became synonymous with the most fervent elements of the club's support base dating back to the early 2010s.

The shield element of the new logo is taken from the original club crest as is the Ancient & Loyal motto with the circular shape of the badge emulating the shape of the Northern soul logo. Wigan had a vibrant Northern soul scene back in the 1960s when the Northern soul music and dance movement first emerged. The background features the club's famous Cherry and White hoops which was incorporated into the club crest for the first time. The date of the club's foundation is also included on the club badge for the first time.

== Kit manufacturers and sponsors ==
Period	Kit Sponsor	Shirt Sponsor
1983–1984	Umbro	none
1984–1988	Umbro	JJB
1988–1989	Umbro	Norweb
1989–1994	Ellgren	Norweb
1994–1996	Puma	Norweb
1997	Bulldog	Norweb
1998–1999	Nike	Energi
2000–2002	Adidas	JJB
2003–2005	Patrick	JJB
2006–2007	JJB	JJB
2008	Kooga	JJB
2009–2010	Kooga	Mecca Bingo
2011	Kooga	Applicado FS
2012–2013	ISC	Applicado FS
2013	ISC	DW Sports
2014	ISC	Houses for Homes
2015	Erreà	Coral
2016–2018	Erreà	
2019	Erreà	Prestone
2020	Hummel	Prestone
2021–2022	Hummel	Iqoniq
2022–2023	Hummel	Open Exchange
2024–	Kappa	Greenmount Projects

=== Current kit ===
The current kit and teamwear as of the 2026 season will be manufacturer by Kappa, following the end of contract with Hummel who manufactured the kits and teamwear from 2020 until the end of the 2023 season. The main shirt sponsor is The Tote, and their logo appears on the front of the home and away jerseys. Greenmount Project, who were on the home and away shirts in 2024 and 2025, are on the front of the charity third shirt.

== Teams ==
As well as the men's team the club for 2024 also encompasses 11 other teams:

- Reserves
- Academy (under 18s)
- Scholarship (under 16s)
- College development squad (men and women aged 16–18)
- Women's first
- Women's academy (under 19s)
- Physical disability
- Learning disability
- Wheelchair
- Wheelchair A (wheelchair reserve team)
- Touch Rugby

== Stadiums ==
=== Pre–1902 ===
Wigan Football Club played on Folly Field, Upper Dicconson Street. The club played its first match at Folly Field on 30 November 1872 and remained at the ground for four years. Wigan Football Club went on to become Wigan & District Football Club, the newly named Wigan & District Football Club played its matches at Prescott Street (The West End Grounds). The club played at Prescott Street until the club disbanded. With the re-formation of the club as Wigan Wasps Football Club, the club returned to Folly Field from 1879 to 1886 when it moved its matches back to Prescott Street.

Wigan played their home games at Wigan Cricket Club on Prescott Street until 1901 when they moved to Springfield Park which they shared with the town's association soccer club Wigan United A.F.C. The first rugby match at Springfield Park was played on 14 September 1901 and was between Wigan and Morecambe in front of 4,000 spectators. The record rugby attendance for the ground was 10,000 achieved on 19 March 1902 when Wigan beat Widnes. Forty days later Wigan played their last game at Springfield Park when they defeated the Rest of Lancashire Senior Competition.

=== 1902–1999: Central Park ===
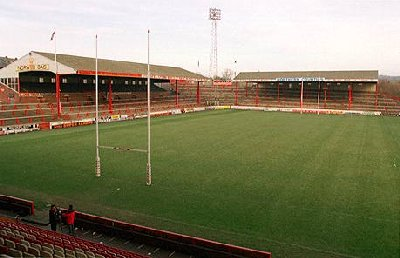
Central Park

In 1902 Wigan moved to their purpose-built rugby ground called Central Park. Wigan played their first game at Central Park against Batley on 6 September 1902, which Wigan won 14–8. The area was originally farm land called Central Field, with a row of houses already built along both north and south ends of the land (Hilton St and Colin St). By the end of the 1990s, the area had begun to suffer from its location next to the River Douglas as well as disused coal mines directly underneath, resulting in occasional drainage problems which affected the pitch.

Central Park would be the home of Wigan Rugby League until 1999, when they moved to the newly built JJB Stadium. The last match at Central Park was against St Helens on 5 September 1999, a game which Wigan won 28–20 in front of 18,179 supporters. As Wigan developed into one of the most famous rugby league clubs in the world, Central Park also became one of the most famous grounds.

Wigan won the 1987 World Club Challenge match against 1987 Sydney (New South Wales Rugby League) Premiers Manly-Warringah at Central Park played on 7 October. The try-less game, won 8–2, was played in front of a reported crowd of 36,895, though many of those in attendance believed the attendance was actually closer to 50,000.

The record attendance for a game at Central Park was 47,747 set on 27 March 1959 against St Helens.

=== 1999–present: The Brick Community Stadium ===
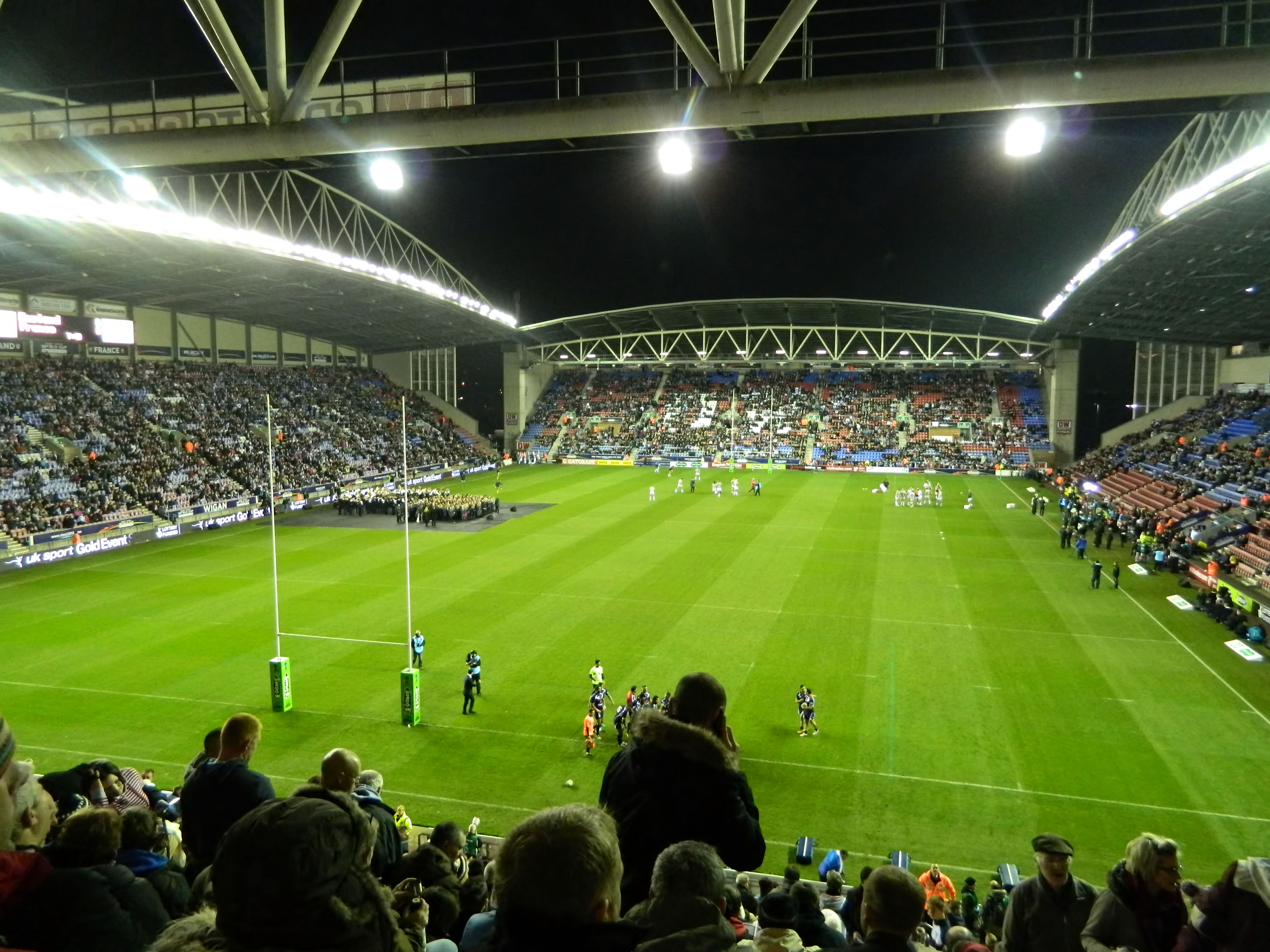
DW Stadium (Renamed in 2024 to the Brick Community Stadium) before the 2013 Rugby League World Cup quarter-final between England and France

Towards the end of the 1999 season Wigan Warriors moved to the newly built JJB Stadium (Renamed in 2024 to the Brick Community Stadium) which they currently share with the Wigan football club Wigan Athletic. The stadium is owned by Mike Danson, who is the majority shareholder. Warriors' first game at the then JJB Stadium was a Super League play-off match against the Castleford Tigers which Wigan lost 14–10.

The stadium has had numerous names since being built in 2007 dependant on its sponsorship.

Wigan used to have a state-of-the-art training facility at the small stadium Edge Hall Road in Orrell (now named the Co-Operative Community Stadium) where the first team, reserve team & academy team prepared, trained and rehabilitated ahead of and after matches. It is also where the Reserve & Academy sides used to play their home games.

Recently this site was sold for development after the Warriors moved all team operations to the newly renovated Robin Park Arena next door to the Brick Community Stadium in a deal with Wigan Council. The redevelopment included new training facilities for the club, while facilities for other local sporting clubs and the general public were retained.

Brick Community Stadium has an official capacity of 25,133. The Warriors' record attendance at the Brick is 25,004 set against St Helens on 25 March 2005.

== Training ground ==
Wigan's training ground is the Robin Park Arena, situated next door to the Brick Community Stadium.

== 2027 squad ==
2027 Wigan Warriors squad
First team squad	Coaching staff
	Head coach: (England) Matt Peet; Assistant coaches: (New Zealand) Thomas Leuluai; (England) Sean O’Loughlin; Legend: (c) Captain(s); (vc) Vice-captain(s); (red card) = suspended; = injured; (gk) = Goal kicker; Updated: Source(s): https://www.wiganwarriors.com

== 2027 transfers ==
=== Gains ===
Player	Club	Contract	Date

=== Losses ===
Player	Club	Contract	Date
(England) Sam Eseh	Bradford Bulls	3 years	8 June 2026
(England) Kruise Leeming	Huddersfield Giants	3 years	8 September 2026
(England) Harvey Makin			2 October 2026
(England) Tom Forber	St Helens	3 years	9 November 2026
(England) Lukas Mason	St Helens		16 November 2026

=== Retired ===
Player	Date
(England) Liam Farrell	6 September 2026

== Coaches ==
=== Current coaching staff ===
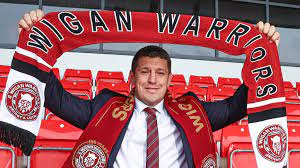
Matt Peet is the current head coach of the Wigan Warriors.

Matt Peet is the current head coach, with former Wigan players Sean O'Loughlin, and Tommy Leuluai as his assistant coaches.

=== Coaching history ===
	Name	Contract started	Contract ended	Reason for leaving	Honours*
(England)	Matt Peet	October 2021			2 Championships, 3 Challenge Cups, 2 League Leaders Shield, 1 World Club Challenge
(Papua New Guinea)	Adrian Lam	October 2018	October 2021	Left at end of contract	1 League Leaders Shield
(England)	Shaun Wane	October 2011	October 2018	Signed by Scotland national rugby union team (as High Performance Coach)	3 Championships, 1 Challenge Cup, 1 World Club Challenge, 1 League Leaders Shield,
(Australia)	Michael Maguire	October 2009	October 2011	Signed by South Sydney Rabbitohs (as head coach)	1 Championship, 1 Challenge Cup, 1 League Leaders Shield
(England)	Brian Noble	April 2006	October 2009	Contract not renewed
(Australia)	Ian Millward	May 2005	April 2006	Sacked
(England)	Denis Betts	May 2004	May 2005	Resigned
(England)	Mike Gregory	July 2003	May 2004	Sick leave
(Australia)	Stuart Raper	May 2001	July 2003	Sacked	1 Challenge Cup
(New Zealand)	Frank Endacott	December 1999	May 2001	Sacked
(England)	Andy Goodway	June 1999	December 1999	Sacked
(Australia)	John Monie	November 1997	June 1999	Sacked	1 Championship
(England)	Eric Hughes	February 1997	November 1997	Sacked
(New Zealand)	Graeme West	May 1994	February 1997	Sacked	2 Championships, 1 Challenge Cup, 1 World Club Challenge
(Australia)	John Dorahy	June 1993	May 1994	Sacked	1 Championship, 1 Challenge Cup
(Australia)	John Monie	September 1989	May 1993	Resigned	4 Championships, 4 Challenge Cups, 1 World Club Challenge
(New Zealand)	Graham Lowe	August 1986	June 1989	Signed by Manly-Warringah Sea Eagles (as head coach)	1 Championship, 2 Challenge Cups, 1 World Club Challenge
(England)	Colin Clarke / Alan McInnes	August 1984	May 1986	Left – mutual consent	1 Challenge Cup
(England)	Alex Murphy	June 1982	August 1984	Sacked
(England)	Maurice Bamford	May 1981	May 1982	Resigned
(Scotland)	George Fairbairn	April 1980	May 1981	Sold
(Wales)	Kel Coslett	October 1979	April 1980	Left – wanted to coach St. Helens
(England)	Vince Karalius	September 1976	September 1979	Resigned
(England)	Joe Coan	January 1975	September 1976	Resigned
(England)	Ted Toohey	May 1974	January 1975	Caretaker
	Graham Starkey	June 1973	May 1974	Sacked
(England)	Eric Ashton	September 1963	May 1973	Resigned	1 Challenge Cup
	Griff Jenkins	October 1961	September 1963	Resigned
	John "Johnny" Lawrenson	September 1961	October 1961	Caretaker
(Wales)	Jim Sullivan	July 1961	September 1961	Ill-Health
(England)	Joe Egan	August 1956	May 1961	Resigned	1 Championship, 2 Challenge Cups
	Edward "Ted" Ward	August 1953	End of 1956	Resigned
	Maurice Hughes	August 1952	End of 1953	Sacked
(Wales)	Jim Sullivan	October 1932	End of 1952	Resigned	5 Championships, 2 Challenge Cups

Note *only Championship/Super League, Super League League Leaders Shield, Challenge Cup and World Club Challenge honours shown.

== Honours ==
- World Club Challenge

Winners (5): 1987, 1991, 1994, 2017, 2024.
Runners-Up (4): 1992, 2011, 2014, 2019.

- Super League:

Winners (7): 1998, 2010, 2013, 2016, 2018, 2023, 2024.
Runners-Up (8): 1996, 2000, 2001, 2003, 2014, 2015, 2020, 2025.

- First Division:

Winners (17): 1908–09, 1921–22, 1925–26, 1933–34, 1945–46, 1946–47, 1949–50, 1951–52, 1959–60, 1986–87, 1989–90, 1990–91, 1991–92, 1992–93, 1993–94, 1994–95, 1995–96.
Runners-Up (10): 1909–10, 1910–11, 1911–12, 1912–13, 1923–24, 1963–64, 1970–71, 1974–75, 1985–86, 1988–89, 1996, 2000, 2001, 2003, 2014, 2015, 2020, 2025.

- Challenge Cup

Winners (22): 1923–24, 1928–29, 1947–48, 1950–51, 1957–58, 1958–59, 1964–65, 1984–85, 1987–88, 1988–89, 1989–90, 1990–91, 1991–92, 1992–93, 1993–94, 1994–95, 2002, 2011, 2013, 2022, 2024, 2026
Runners-Up (12): 1910–11, 1919–20, 1943–44, 1945–46, 1960–61, 1962–63, 1965–66, 1969–70, 1983–84, 1998, 2004, 2017.

- League Leaders' Shield: (Note: For most of RFL history a play-off system has been used to determine the league champions, with the league leaders' shield only becoming a separate honour in the Super League era. Wigan have achieved 1st in the league place 25 times: 1908–09, 1910–11, 1923–24, 1925–26, 1945–46, 1946–47, 1947–48, 1949–50, 1961–62, 1970–71, 1986–87, 1989–90, 1990–91, 1991–92, 1992–93, 1993–94, 1994–95, 1995–96, 1998, 2000, 2010, 2012, 2020, 2023, 2024. (Note: This does not include a further two 1st place finishes in the wartime emergency leagues) A separate League Leaders' Trophy was awarded in 1971)

Winners (6): 2010, 2012, 2020, 2023, 2024, 2026

- League Leader's Trophy:

Winners (1): 1970–71

- Lancashire Cup

Winners (21): 1905–06, 1908–09, 1909–10, 1912–13, 1922–23, 1928–29, 1938–39, 1946–47, 1947–48, 1948–49, 1949–50, 1950–51, 1951–52, 1966–67, 1971–72, 1973–74, 1985–86, 1986–87, 1987–88, 1988–89, 1992–93.
Runners-Up (14): 1913–14, 1914–15, 1925–26, 1927–28, 1930–31, 1934–35, 1935–36, 1936–37, 1945–46, 1953–54, 1957–58, 1977–78, 1980–81, 1984–85.

- Lancashire League

Winners (18): 1901–02, 1908–09, 1910–11, 1911–12, 1912–13, 1913–14, 1914–15, 1920–21, 1922–23, 1923–24, 1925–26, 1945–46, 1946–47, 1949–50, 1951–52, 1958–59, 1961–62, 1969–70.

- Lancashire War League

Winners (1): 1940–41.

- Premiership

Winners (6): 1986–87, 1991–92, 1993–94, 1994–95, 1996, 1997.
Runners-Up (1): 1992–93

- War Emergency League

Winners (1): 1943–44.

- League Cup

Winners (8): 1982–83, 1985–86, 1986–87, 1988–89, 1989–90, 1992–93, 1994–95, 1995–96.
Runners-Up (1): 1993–94.

- BBC2 Floodlit Trophy

Winners (1): 1968–69.
Runners-Up (1): 1969–70.

- Charity Shield

Winners (4): 1985–86, 1987–88, 1991–92, 1995–96.
Runners-Up (4): 1988–89, 1989–90, 1990–91, 1992–93.

- Second Division / Championship:

Runners-Up (1): 1980–81

- Locker Cup previously Wardonia Cup

Winners (35): 1945, 1946, 1947, 1949, 1951, 1952, 1953, 1957, 1958, 1959, 1960, 1961, 1964, 1965, 1969, 1970, 1971, 1972, 1975, 1977, 1995, 2022, 2023, 2024, 2025 (Won on 10 occasions between 1979 and 1994).
Runners-Up (22): 1938, 1948, 1950, 1954, 1955, 1956, 1962, 1963, 1966, 1967, 1973, 1974, 1976, 1978, 2019, 2026. (Runners-Up on 6 occasions between 1979 and 1994).

- Kenny-Sterling Shield

Winners (1): 2018.

- World 7s

Winners (1): 1991–92.

- Carnegie Floodlit 9s

Winners (1): 2010.

- Middlesex 7s

Winners (1): 1996

- Wigan Charity Cup (Pre-Northern Union)

Winners (6): 1883, 1885, 1888, 1889, 1890, 1891
Runners-Up (1): 1886

- West Lancashire and Border Towns Cup (Pre-Northern Union)

Winners (2): 1889, 1890
Runners-Up (1): 1887

- BBC Sports Team of the Year Award: 1994, 2024

== Club records ==
=== Individual ===
- Most goals in a match: 22 by Jim Sullivan vs Flimby & Fothergill, 14 February 1925
- Most tries in a match: 10 by:
  - Martin Offiah vs Leeds, 10 May 1992
  - Shaun Edwards vs Swinton, 29 September 1992
- Most points in a match: 44 by Jim Sullivan vs Flimby & Fothergill, 14 February 1925
- Most goals in a season: 186 by Frano Botica, 1994–95
- Most tries in a season: 63 by Ellery Hanley, 1986–87
- Most tries in a Super League regular season: 31 by Josh Charnley and Bevan French, 2012 and 2022
- Most points in a season: 462 by Pat Richards 2010
- Most career goals: 2,317 by Jim Sullivan
- Most career tries: 478 by Billy Boston
- Most career points: 4,883 by Jim Sullivan
- Most career appearances: 774 by Jim Sullivan
- Most International Test caps: 36 by Shaun Edwards (Great Britain)
- Most decorated player: Shaun Edwards; 8 Championships, 9 Challenge Cups, 3 World Club Challenges.

=== Team ===
- Biggest victory (All Time): 116–0 vs Flimby & Fothergill, 14 February 1925
- Biggest victory (Super League Era): 84–6 vs Hull Kingston Rovers, 1 April 2013 & 84–6 vs Bradford Bulls, 21 April 2014.
- Highest attendance (Central Park): 47,747 vs St. Helens, 27 March 1959
- Highest attendance (DW Stadium): 25,004 (Good Friday 2005 vs St Helens)
- Highest attendance (all-time): 99,801 vs Hull F.C., 4 May 1985 (1985 Challenge Cup Final) at Wembley Stadium
- Highest attendance vs an international touring team: 30,622 vs Australia, 12 October 1986 (1986 Kangaroo Tour)
- Heaviest Defeat (Super League): 0–70 vs Leeds Rhinos, 18 June 2005
- Heaviest Defeat (All Time): 0–75 vs St Helens, 26 June 2005
- Most trophies in one season: 4, 2024 (SL, LLS, CC, WCC)

== Academy ==
The Wigan academy and youth development system produces players for professional Rugby League. The club's first-team squad historically includes a significant number of homegrown players. Furthermore, numerous graduates from the youth system who leave Wigan go on play for other clubs across the Super League and Championship.

== Supporters ==
Wigan is one of the most well supported British rugby league clubs.

Home matches during the 1880s saw Wigan regularly attracted over 7,000 supporters. The rugby code often dwarfed those seen on the same weekend at Association Football matches around the country. Up until 1895, Wigan had 18 matches that attracted over 8,000 supporters on home soil whilst matches against Warrington, Swinton and Oldham were a big draw on away days. The highest recorded home attendance was for the 1886 Wigan Union Charity Cup Final between Wigan and Aspull which attracted 18,000 spectators.

During the 1880s, Wigan fans often took advantage of local train companies offering cheap rail fares for big matches. The local train companies took advantage of Wigan supporters who travelled in numbers to away matches. The most popular matches of that era included trips to Warrington and Swinton where between 2,000 and 3,000 supporters travelled regularly.

During the 2006 season, in which the team was struggling to avoid relegation, home attendances increased as fans came to support the club and offer vocal support, many of whom may have not attended on a regular basis previously.

The club averaged 16,016 per home game in 2007. In 2010 Wigan were officially the best-supported club in Super League with a higher average attendance than nearest rivals Leeds Rhinos. The club have now been confirmed as the best-supported club for the last three seasons of 2010, 2011 and 2012.

As a gesture of thanks, the 2008 season saw the Wigan fans have the squad number 18 dedicated to them, a practice which has since continued each season. Joe Lydon commented "This is a new practice for clubs who recognise the extra special support which loyal fans can provide to their team in both good and bad times. It is particularly apt for Wigan fans".

From early 2008, the Wigan fans have often chanted to the tune of "The Entertainer". One of the beginning lines of this particular chant is "We're the Greatest Club in the World".

The fans have their own supporters club, The Riversiders, who meet monthly and often have special guests at the meetings including past and present players, coaching staff and members of the Rugby Football League.

In 2010 some supporters set up a group to improve the atmosphere at both home and away games, known as the Wigan Brigantes, Brigantes being the name of the tribe that inhabited this and other large parts of northern England before and during the Roman era. The group started by erecting flags across the South Stand gantry at the DW Stadium, beginning with 12 at the start of the 2010 season and grew steadily from there. The group's banner had the phrase "Long After Tonight Is All Over" as a nod to the Jimmy Radcliffe song that was a staple of the Wigan Casino club during the Northern soul era, and to show their rivals that their support would continue well after the final whistle had sounded. This was particularly true of some of Wigan's away games during the 2011 season, where their fans often stayed well over half an hour after the final hooter singing to the tune of "Dale Cavese".

There is also a regular fans' forum meeting with chairman Professor Chris Brookes and the current head coach to discuss the latest issues concerning the club and the work that is being done behind the scenes.

Wigan's fans and Wigan people in general are known as 'pie eaters' or 'pies' which is reference to the 1926 General Strike, when Wigan miners were forced to eat 'humble pie' and return to work before miners in other towns, even though they had been on strike before the other towns joined in. Since then the word 'pie' has come to mean the pastry rather than the metaphor 'Humble Pie', with many fine bakeries and bakers in the town.

== Rivalries ==
=== St Helens ===
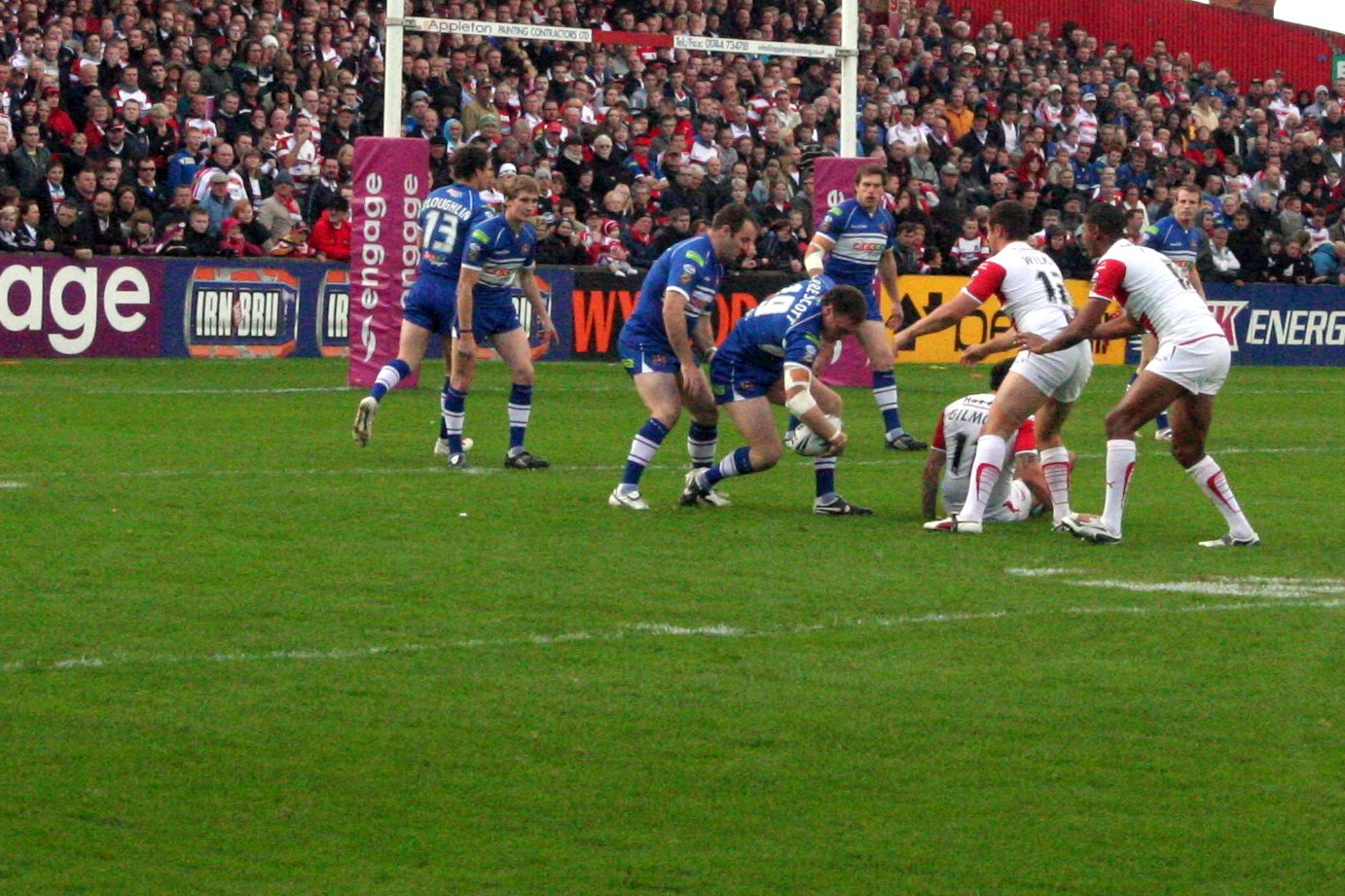
Wigan playing St Helens during the Super League XIV Semi-finals

The club's strongest and fiercest rivalry is with St Helens.

Matches between the two teams are played traditionally on Good Friday and Boxing Day, though the latter fixture has stopped following the move to summer rugby in 1996. The first meeting between the two sides took place in November 1895, where the two sides played out a 0–0 stalemate in front of 3,000 spectators at Knowsley Road.

The two clubs are two of the most successful clubs in world Rugby League and regularly compete against one another for silverware.

Wigan boast of having beaten the Saints in the last meetings at Central Park and Knowsley Road and the first meeting at Langtree Park. Saints did, however, defeat the Warriors in the first meeting at the JJB Stadium. The sides have met in the Challenge Cup Final a total of six times, both sides having been successful three times. However, the Saints boast a better record in Super League Grand Finals, having defeated Wigan three times in four meetings.

Overall, Wigan have a superior record over their rivals, having won 210 of the contests to St Helens' 139.

As of July 2026, the last meeting between the two sides resulted in a 38–16 win to Wigan at the Brick Community Stadium.

=== Leigh Leopards ===
The Leigh Leopards are traditional rivals of the club due to both being located within the Borough of Wigan. Matches between the two clubs are, therefore, local derbies. The derby is also referred to as the "Bus Stop Derby" with Wigan fans occasionally chanting that Leigh are "just a bus stop in Wigan".

The rivalry between these two clubs, however, has been muted due to the fact that the two clubs have regularly competed in different competitions and, therefore, have not played each other consistently (during the Super League era, Wigan and Leigh have only been together in Super League for seven seasons, in 2005, 2017, 2021, 2023, 2024, 2025, and 2026).

The 2023 season saw heightened attention being given toward the rivalry as both clubs enjoyed successful seasons, the branding of the rivalry as "The Battle of The Borough" gained notoriety because of this.

As of July 2025, Wigan have won 157 meetings to Leigh's 57.

On 1 October 2025 it was announced by both Wigan and the BBC that Leigh owner Derek Beaumont had emailed Wigan to state that his club would not take part in their 2025 Super League season semi-final match due to ticket allocation issues. Beaumont claimed that Wigan's offer of 5,400 tickets for Leigh fans (22% of Wigan's Brick Community Stadium capacity) was not acceptable. Wigan stated that the "allocation had been determined by the independent Safety Advisory Group and the club's Ground Safety Officer, following consultation with the police" and added "[the] Super League had "sought separate safety advice" and had "fully endorsed this approach". Leigh went on to lose the semi-final against Wigan 18–6.

The most recent meeting between the two clubs came on 31 July 2026, when Wigan defeated Leigh 8-20.

=== Warrington Wolves ===
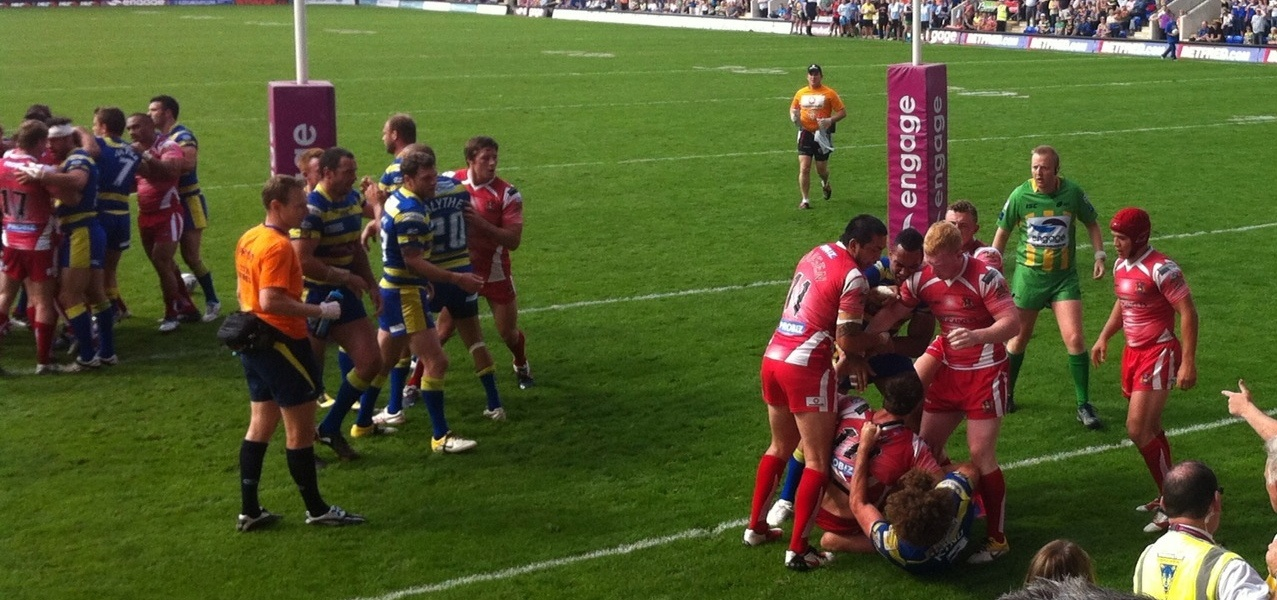
Fights between players of both teams during a Super League match on 4 September 2011

Wigan also have a rivalry with neighbours Warrington Wolves. This rivalry has become particularly fierce from the late 2000s onwards, owing to the Wolves' emergence as a club that contends for silverware. The Warriors also failed to claim victory at Warrington's Halliwell Jones Stadium for seven years following its opening in 2003. Furthermore, the two clubs compete annually for the Locker Cup.

The clubs have met in two Challenge Cup Finals and three Super League Grand Finals, Wigan having won all five. Wigan supporters enjoying mocking Wolves fans for their club's failure to win the Championship since 1955.

Wigan also boast the superior record in head-to-head meetings, claiming 192 wins to Warrington's 127.

The last meeting between the two sides was on 10 July 2026 with Wigan defeating the Wolves 30-18, despite missing several first team regulars.

In July 2024, it was announced that Wigan and Warrington would play each other in Las Vegas on 1 March 2025, in the first Super League game to take place in the United States. The Warriors won the contest 48–24 with 8 different Wigan players scoring tries.

=== Leeds Rhinos ===
A more notable rivalry is one with Leeds Rhinos, given the two clubs' respective status as two of the most successful and best-supported clubs in British rugby league. Between 2007 and 2018, the only season either Leeds or Wigan did not win the Super League Grand Final was in 2014. The sides only met once in that period at Old Trafford, with the Rhinos winning 22–20 in 2015. However, that is the only time the Rhinos have defeated the Warriors in a major final – Wigan having beaten Leeds in three Challenge Cup Finals, and the 1998 Super League Grand Final.

In head-to-head meetings between the two sides since 1896, Wigan have claimed victory 158 times whilst Leeds have won 107.

At the time of writing, the last match between the two clubs was on 5th September 2026. In a match billed as a shoot-out for the League Leaders Shield, the Warriors thumped the Rhinos 8-40 to leapfrog Leeds into top spot going into the final round of the regular season.

=== Hull Kingston Rovers ===
A more recent rivalry that has emerged since around 2023 is with Hull Kingston Rovers following the Robins' emergence as a club challenging for major honours.

The sides met in the 2023 and 2024 Challenge Cup semi-finals, the 2023 Super League play-off semi-final, and in the 2024 and 2025 Super League Grand Finals. The sides most recently met in the 2026 Challenge Cup Final on 30 May, with Wigan securing a dominant 40-10 win to claim a record-extending 22nd Challenge Cup title.

The Warriors completed an historic 'quadruple' in 2024, whilst the Robins completed the treble in 2025.

As of August 2026, the last meeting between the two sides occurred on 27th August 2026, with the Warriors defeating the Robins 46-0 in atrocious conditions.

The sides have met 163 times, with winning winning 103 to Hull KR's 54. However, the record since 2023 is more even, with Wigan winning 9 contests to the Robins' 6.

== In the community ==
Wigan confirmed via the official website that they had been granted charitable status on Wednesday 29 April 2009 via the "charitable arm" of the club the Wigan Warriors Community Foundation. Wigan Warriors carry out community work that stretches from Amateur Rugby League Football clubs to Schools as well as running successful community training camps for young people. A part of the community work is visiting primary schools to deliver a programme specifically designed for young people entitled 'Lessons for Life'. The programme is delivered via a geographic family of schools approach and results in each school receiving two hours of Rugby League coaching per week for a six-week period. Additionally every school is offered the opportunity to start an extra curricular club and take part in a "Warriors Tag Festival". The club will now be able to deliver an extensive community programme via the Wigan Warriors Community Foundation.

Wigan became the first club in the country to receive Sport England's Clubmark Gold Award. The Gold award, only available from 1 April 2009, shows the clubs commitment to Duty of Care and Child Protection, Coaching and Competition, Sports Equity and Ethics and Club Management. The Gold award not only meets the minimum standards in all areas, but surpasses them and meets additional criteria too.

Combined with education provider ProCo, Wigan have established a work based learning academy in the town to provide opportunities to young people whilst also providing a permanent base for its scholarship and academy squads. The Work Academy has been given the name "Central Park" in reference to Wigan's former home and also makes reference to the education provider.

== See also ==
- History of Wigan Warriors
- List of Wigan Warriors seasons
- List of Wigan Warriors players
- List of Wigan Warriors internationals
