= St Helens R.F.C.–Wigan Warriors rivalry =

British rugby league rivalry

St Helens R.F.C. – Wigan Warriors rivalry
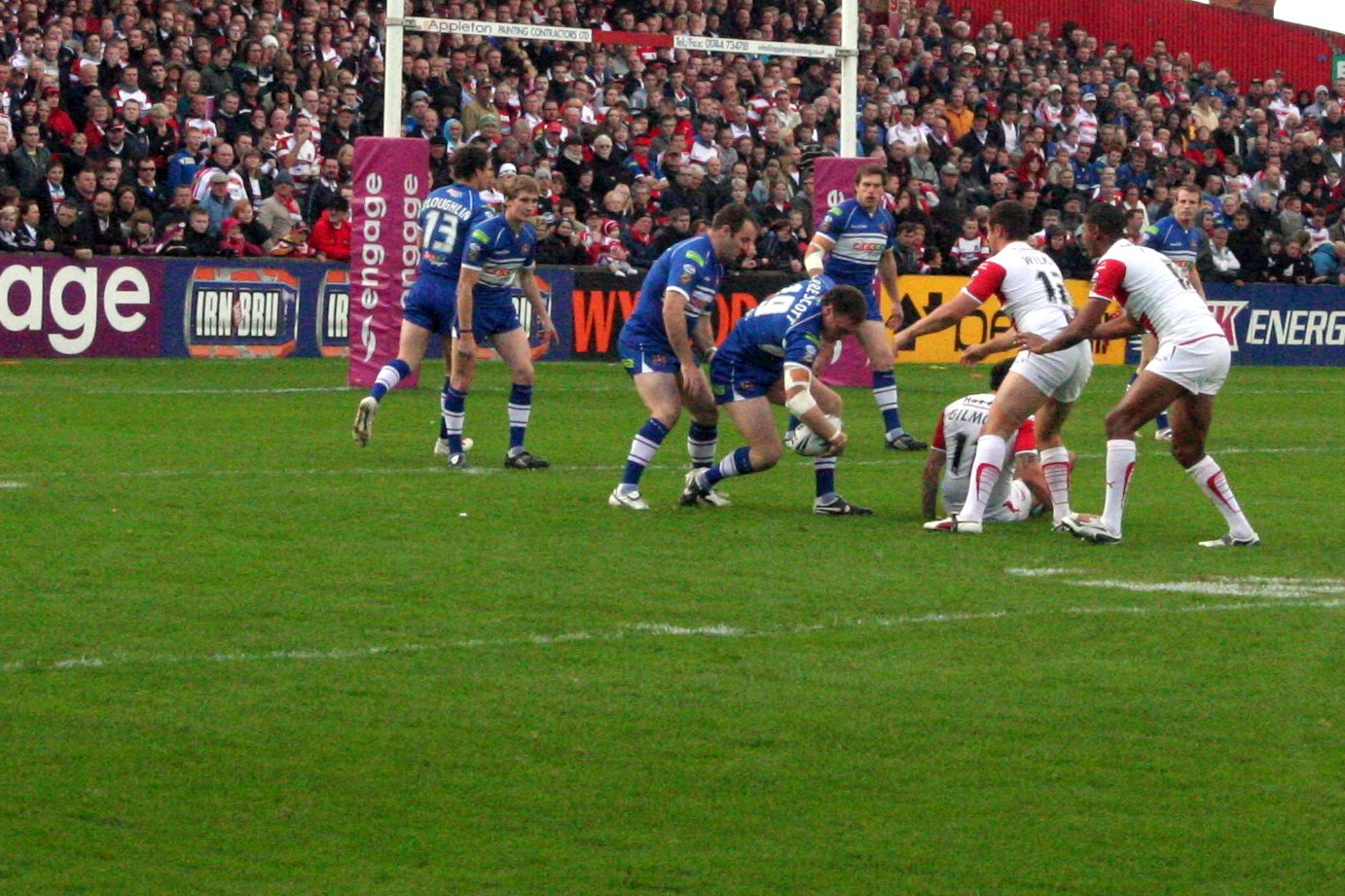
- St Helens vs Wigan Warriors during the Super League XIV Semi-finals
- Other names: Wigan Saints Derby; The Good Friday Derby; The Boxing Day Derby
- Location: Lancashire, England
- Teams: St. Helens; Wigan Warriors
- First meeting: 5 December 1874 (First Recorded Fixture), 16 November 1895 (First Recorded Rugby League Fixture)
- Latest meeting: 24 July 2026 (Wigan 38-16 St Helens)
- Stadiums: BrewDog Stadium; DW Stadium

Statistics
- Total meetings: 367
- Most wins: Wigan (210)
- All-time series (RFL-1 and SL only): 278
- Regular season series: 243
- Largest victory: St. Helens 75 – 0 Wigan

The St Helens R.F.C. – Wigan Warriors rivalry is a historic local rivalry between the rugby league clubs St Helens and the Wigan Warriors, based in North West England. The rivalry is born out of relative proximity of the two towns, but as two of the most successful clubs in British rugby it has become a marquee event in the calendar.

Initially at least one fixture was played on Boxing Day annually and was known as the Boxing Day Derby, later the second fixture settled on Good Friday. Following the decision to move the competition from winter to summer, the Good Friday Derby remains the one traditionally fixed game in the calendar.

== History ==
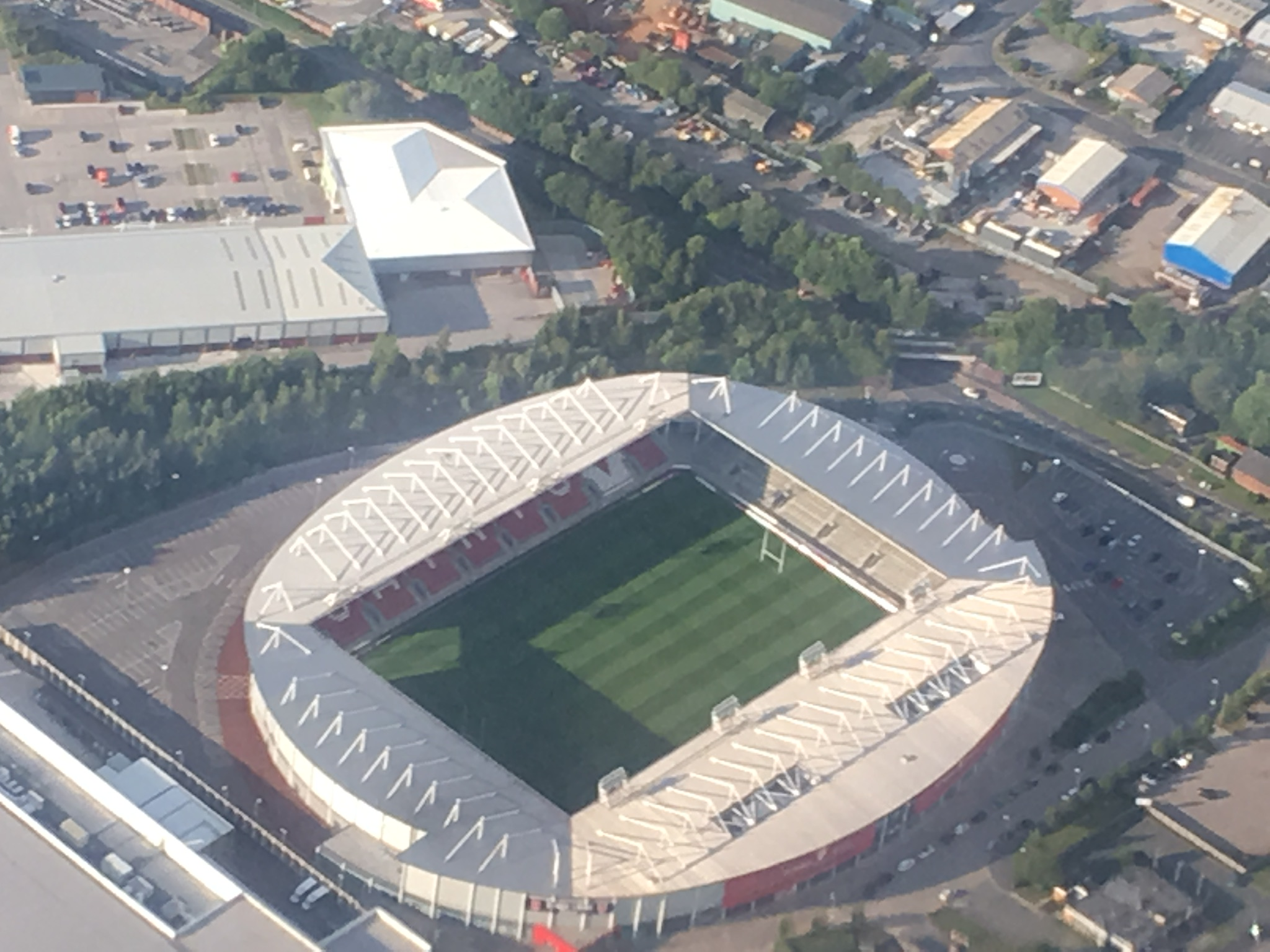
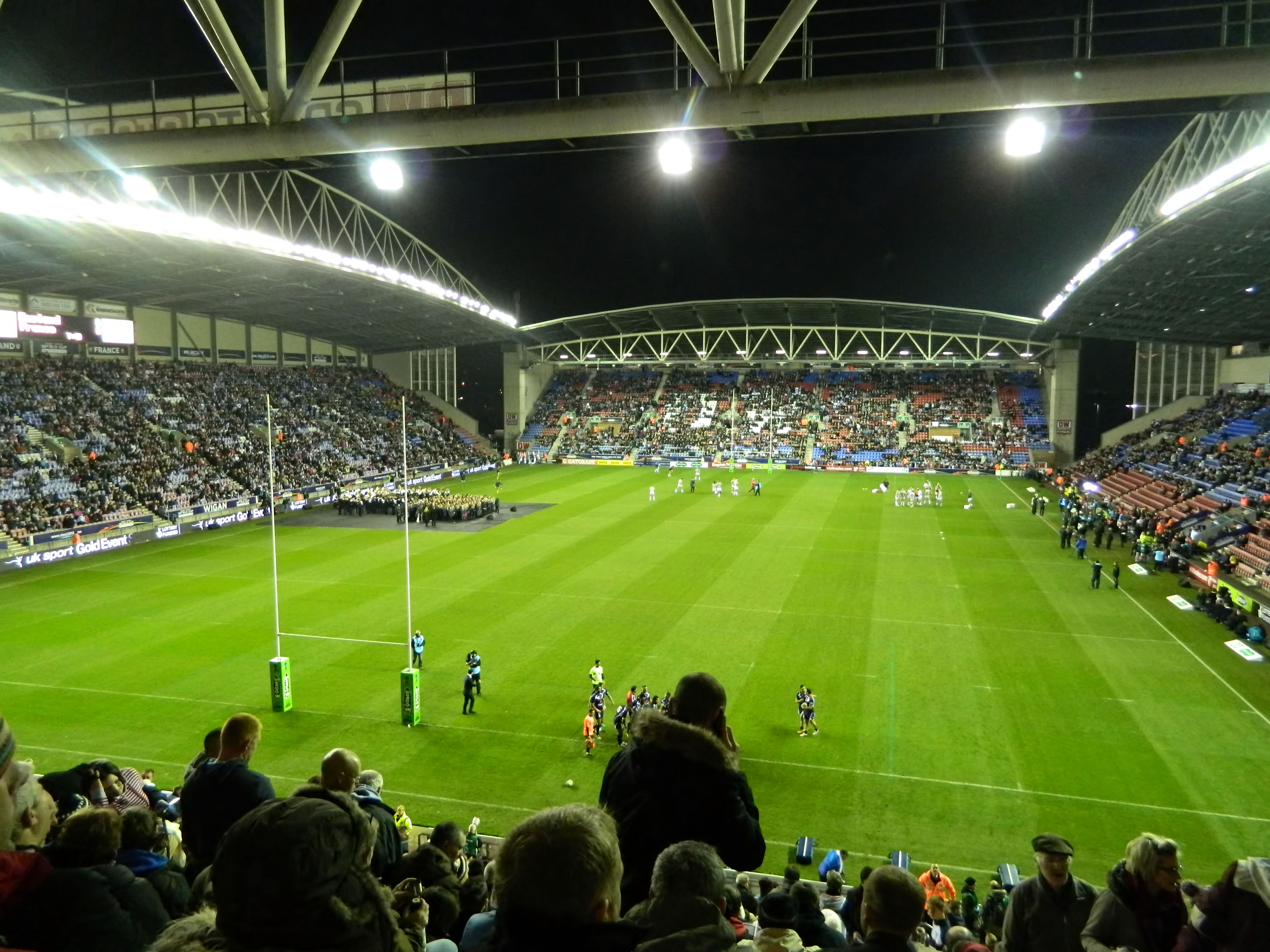
The BrewDog Stadium (left) and the DW Stadium (right) are the homes of The Saints and The Warriors.

St Helens and Wigan are two of the original twenty-two northern rugby clubs that broke away from the Rugby Football Union to form the Northern Union in 1895, which gave birth to the modern day sport of rugby league. Prior to this, the clubs first met on 5 December 1874 in a fixture at St Helens with the match ending in a draw. The two clubs first encounter in the Northern Union was in the first season of the new code. The fixture was played at St Helens' Knowsley Road ground and ended in a 0-0 draw. The clubs have since faced each other over 300 times in all competitions, and the rivalry has grown to become rugby league's biggest derby encounter.

Over the years the two clubs have become very successful. Wigan are the most successful club in British rugby league, having won 24 league titles and 22 Challenge Cups. St Helens are the second most successful team with 17 league titles and 13 Challenge Cup wins. In rugby league grand finals, the clubs have contested five league championship matches with St Helens claiming the title at Wigan's expense on four occasions in 1971, 2000, 2014, and 2020 to Wigan's one grand final success over Saints in 2010.

| St Helens R.F.C.–Wigan Warriors rivalry is located in Merseyside | St Helens R.F.C.–Wigan Warriors rivalry is located in Greater Manchester |
Locations of St Helens and Wigan on maps of Merseyside (left) and Greater Manchester (right).

=== Traditional dates ===
In keeping with tradition, derby fixtures within the RFL have usually been played on Boxing Day and Good Friday. The first Boxing Day fixture between Wigan and St Helens took place in 1905.

Since the move to summer seasons in 1996, Boxing Day games have no longer been competitive and has seen events like Leeds's and Wakefield's Festive Challenge emerge in keeping with the Boxing Day tradition. The Super League however has kept to the tradition of having derbies on Good Friday with St Helens and Wigan not competing a Good Friday Derby on only three occasions since the summer switch.

== Head to Head ==
Statistics correct as of 25/07/2026.

In all Rugby League competitions, competitive and uncompetitive:

| Played | St Helens | Drawn | Wigan |
|---|---|---|---|
| 367 (Note: Two of these fixtures were abandoned) | 139 | 18 | 210 |

=== Matches by competition ===
| Competition | Played |
|---|---|
| League (Inc. RFL-1 and SL) | 278 (Note: Regular Season: 243; Playoffs: 14) |
| Challenge Cup | 30 |
| League Cup | 2 |
| Charity Shield | 1 |
| Premiership | 11 |
| Lancashire League | 17 |
| Lancashire Cup | 17 |
| Yorkshire Cup | 4 |
| BBC2 Floodlit Trophy | 6 |
| Wartime Emergency League | 14 |
| Lancashire Wartime Emergency League | 4 |
| Friendlies | 15 |

=== Meetings in major finals ===
- 1953–54 Lancashire Cup Final: St Helens 16–8 Wigan
- 1960–61 Challenge Cup Final: St Helens 12–6 Wigan
- 1965–66 Challenge Cup Final: St Helens 21–2 Wigan
- 1970–71 NFRL Division One Championship Final: St Helens 16–12 Wigan
- 1984–85 Lancashire Cup Final: St Helens 26–18 Wigan
- 1988–89 Challenge Cup Final: Wigan 27–0 St Helens
- 1990–91 Challenge Cup Final: Wigan 13–8 St Helens
- 1991–92 Premiership Final: Wigan 48–16 St Helens
- 1992–93 Charity Shield: St Helens 17–0 Wigan
- 1992–93 Lancashire Cup Final: Wigan 5–4 St Helens
- 1992–93 Premiership Final: St Helens 10–4 Wigan
- 1995–96 League Cup Final: Wigan 48–16 St Helens
- 1996 Premiership Final: Wigan 25–16 St Helens
- 1997 Premiership Final: Wigan 32–20 St Helens
- 2000 Super League Grand Final: St Helens 29–16 Wigan
- 2002 Challenge Cup Final: Wigan 21–12 St Helens
- 2004 Challenge Cup Final: St Helens 32–16 Wigan
- 2010 Super League Grand Final: Wigan 22–10 St Helens
- 2014 Super League Grand Final: St Helens 14–6 Wigan
- 2020 Super League Grand Final: St Helens 8–4 Wigan

== Collective Honours ==
As of the 2024 season

| St Helens | | Honour | Wigan Warriors | |
| Rank | No. | Honour | No. | Rank |
|---|---|---|---|---|
| 2nd | 17 | League Championships | 24 | 1st |
| 2nd | 16 | League Leaders | 22 | 1st |
| 3rd | 13 | Challenge Cup | 22 | 1st |
| 3rd | 4 | Premiership | 6 | 1st (Note: Join first with Widnes Vikings) |
| 6th | 1 | League Cup | 8 | 1st |
| 3rd | 1 | Charity Shield | 4 | 1st |
| 3rd | 3 | World Club Challenge | 5 | 1st |
| 2nd | 8 | Lancashire League | 18 | 1st |
| 2nd | 11 | Lancashire Cup | 21 | 1st |
| 2nd (Note: Joint second with Salford Red Devils and Leigh Centurions.) | 2 | BBC2 Floodlit Trophy | 1 | 5th |
Both teams have also received the BBC Sports Team of the Year Award once.

== See also ==
- Derbies in the Rugby Football League
