= Heavy Woollen Derby =

Batley Bulldogs – Dewsbury Rams The Heavy Woollen Derby
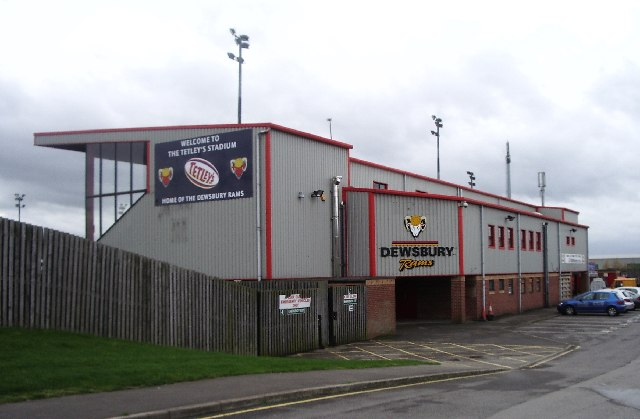
- FLAIR Stadium, home of Dewsbury, hosts of the 2025 Boxing Day match
- Location: Heavy Woollen District, West Yorkshire, England
- Teams: Batley Bulldogs; Dewsbury Rams
- First meeting: 30 October 1909 (Batley 8–4 Dewsbury)
- Latest meeting: 26 December 2025 (Dewsbury Rams 0-18 Batley Bulldogs)
- Next meeting: 5 April 2026 (Mount Pleasant, Batley)
- Stadiums: Mount Pleasant; Crown Flatt

Statistics
- Total meetings: 56
- Most wins: Batley Bulldogs (32)

The Heavy Woollen Derby refers to the rugby league rivalry between Batley Bulldogs and Dewsbury Rams, both located in the Heavy Woollen district of West Yorkshire. The two sides compete an annual friendly on Boxing Day to celebrate their rivalry.

== Head-to-head record ==
Statistics correct as of 19/5/21

In all competitions, competitive and uncompetitive:

Played	Batley	Drawn	Dewsbury
53	30	0	24

=== Meetings in major finals ===
The two sides have never met in a major final.

== Collective Honours ==
Batley Bulldogs		Honour	Dewsbury Rams	
Rank	No.	Honour	No.	Rank
17th	1	League (D1)	1	17th
—N/a	0	League (D2)	2	4th
12th	3	Challenge Cup	2	16th
8th	2	Yorkshire League	0	—N/a
13th	1	Yorkshire Cup	3	9th

== Boxing Day Challenge ==
The Boxing Day Challenge is an annual Rugby league friendly match that takes place on 26 December in which the teams compete for the Roy Powell Trophy. The venue alternates between the two sides' home grounds: Crown Flatt (The Tetley's Stadium) and the Fox's Biscuits Stadium (Mount Pleasant) respectively. Before the move to the summer season from 1996, the teams would often meet for matches on Boxing Day and New Year's Day as part of their regular league schedule.

The trophy is named in honour of Roy Powell who died on 27 December 1998. Powell was born in Dewsbury, and in 1998 had been part of the Batley team that won the Trans-Pennine Cup.

=== Results ===
Year	Home team	Result	Away team	Attendance	Ref.
2009	Dewsbury	12–20	Batley	2,411	
2010 (Note: Postponed to 2 January 2011 due to poor weather)	Batley	30–6	Dewsbury	2,027	
2011	Dewsbury	28–6	Batley		
2012	Batley	28–18	Dewsbury		
2013	Dewsbury	4–10	Batley		
2014	Batley	18–16	Dewsbury		
2015	Dewsbury	4–12	Batley	2,123	
2016	Batley	28–18	Dewsbury		
2017	Dewsbury	16–28	Batley		
2018	Batley	16–10	Dewsbury		
2019	Dewsbury	14–14	Batley		
2020	Cancelled due to the COVID-19 pandemic				
2021	Cancelled due to the COVID-19 pandemic				
2022	Batley	32–22	Dewsbury		
2023	Dewsbury	12–12	Batley	1,893	
2024	Batley	36–16	Dewsbury	1,883	

== See also ==
- Festive Challenge
- West Yorkshire derbies
- Derbies in the Rugby Football League
