= West Yorkshire derbies =

English sporting rivalries

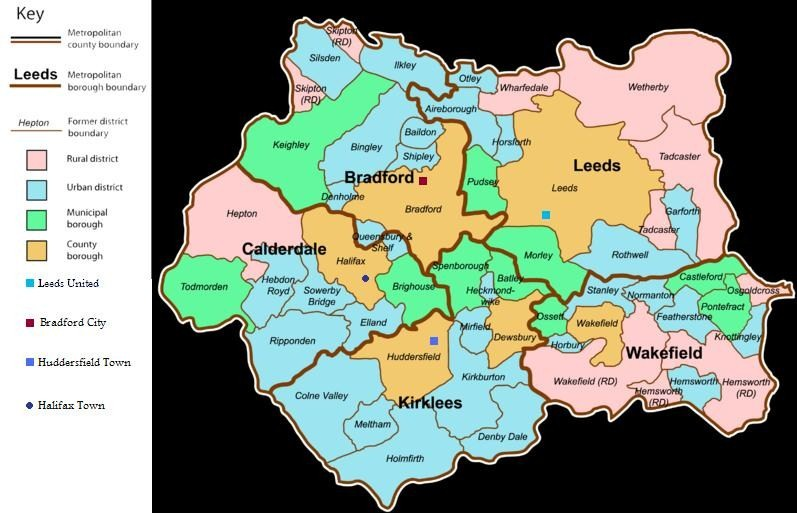
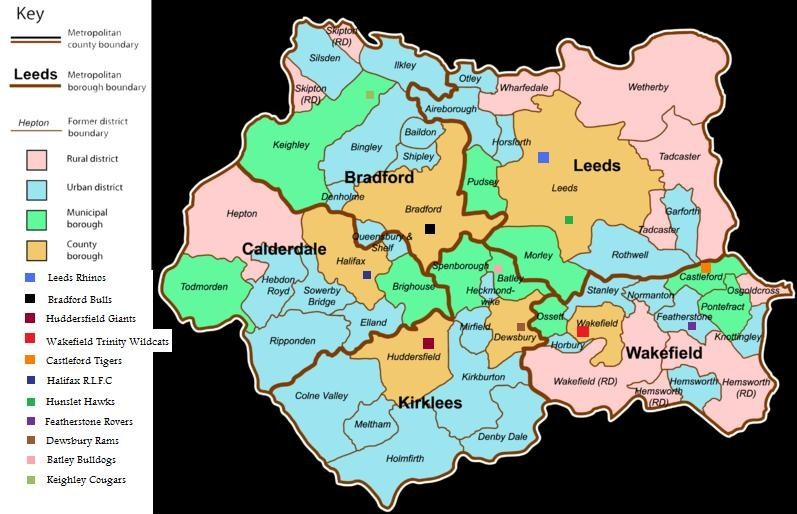
Map of West Yorkshire showing the proximity of football clubs (top) and rugby league clubs (bottom), August 2010.

The West Yorkshire derbies are a series of football matches or rugby league matches taking place between football or rugby league clubs from West Yorkshire.

== In football ==
=== History ===
Leeds United's relegation to League One in 2007 may have reignited this rivalry, although Bradford's relegation to League Two removed the possibility that the three major West Yorkshire football teams (Bradford, Huddersfield and Leeds) might be in the same division for the first time since the 1980s in the 2007–08 season; ultimately only Huddersfield and Leeds met each other in the third tier. In the 2010–11 and 2011–12 seasons all three teams involved in the West Yorkshire Derby were in different leagues, Bradford City were in League Two, Huddersfield Town were in League One and Leeds United played in the Championship. At the end of the 2011–12 season, Huddersfield were promoted from League One to the Championship, rekindling the rivalry with Leeds. In 2016–17 Huddersfield were promoted to the Premier League, making the rivalry go into hiatus again. Huddersfield were relegated at the end of the 2018–19 season and Leeds completed the double over their local rivals in the 2019–20 EFL Championship season on their way to winning promotion back to the Premier League after a 16-year absence. In the 2023–24 EFL Championship, the rivalry made a return, with Leeds winning 4–1 at Elland Road in October 2023 before a 1–1 draw at the John Smith's Stadium in March 2024.

=== Bradford City and Leeds United ===
Bradford City – Leeds United
- Location: West Yorkshire
- Teams: Bradford City; Leeds United; Leeds City (until dissolution)
- First meeting: 23 September 1922; Second Division; Leeds United 1–0 Bradford City
- Latest meeting: 27 August 2014; League Cup; Bradford City 2–1 Leeds United
- Stadiums: Valley Parade; Elland Road

Statistics
- Total meetings: 31 (6 v Leeds City)
- Most wins: Leeds United (14)
- Largest victory: Bradford City 5–0 Leeds City (Second Division, September 1905); Leeds United 6–1 Bradford City (Premier League, 13 May 2001)

Bradford City has a long-standing rivalry with Leeds United in the modern era.

This rivalry is mainly due to the two cities' proximity to one another, which has exacerbated in later years because there has been some football fans within Bradford choosing to travel the short distance to support Leeds rather than the home town's City. Although Leeds fans are unlikely to raise the same level of emotion talking about Bradford that a City fan would in talking about Leeds. There may be other reasons, including the setting alight of a chip van by Leeds fans during a game between the two sides at Odsal perceived by some as a mockery of the Bradford City stadium fire.

The last meeting between these two sides was at Valley Parade on 27 August 2014 in the Football League Cup, Leeds took a 1–0 lead in the 82nd minute, but Bradford won the game with goals from Billy Knott and James Hanson.

=== Bradford City and Leeds City ===
Before the formation of Leeds United, Bradford City had a rivalry with Leeds City until its dissolution in 1919. Both the clubs played each other 6 times in Football League Second Division, where Bradford City won 4 times and 2 matches ended in a draw.

==== Head-to-head record (including Leeds City) ====
Competition	Played	Bradford City wins	Draws	Leeds City wins	Bradford City goals	Leeds City goals
League	6	4	2	0	12	3
Total	6	4	2	0	12	3
Competition	Played	Bradford City wins	Draws	Leeds United wins	Bradford City goals	Leeds United goals
League	20	2	7	11	16	24
League Cup	3	1	0	2	4	5
EFL Trophy	1	0	0	1	1	2
Full Members' Cup	1	1	0	0	1	0
Total	25	4	7	14	22	31
Overall total	31	8	9	14	34	34

==== List of matches ====
Current as of 27 August 2014. Statistics obtained from Soccerbase.

#	Season	Date	Competition	Home Team	Result	Away Team	Venue
Bradford City vs Leeds City
1	1905–06	2 September 1905	Division Two	Bradford City	1–0	Leeds City	Valley Parade
2	1905–06	30 December 1905	Division Two	Leeds City	0–2	Bradford City	Elland Road
3	1906–07	1 September 1906	Division Two	Leeds City	1–1	Bradford City	Elland Road
4	1906–07	29 December 1906	Division Two	Bradford City	2–2	Leeds City	Valley Parade
5	1907–08	1 September 1906	Division Two	Bradford City	5–0	Leeds City	Valley Parade
6	1907–08	1 February 1908	Division Two	Leeds City	0–1	Bradford City	Elland Road
Bradford City vs Leeds United
1	1922–23	23 September 1922	Division Two	Leeds United	1–0	Bradford City	Elland Road
2	1922–23	30 September 1922	Division Two	Bradford City	0–2	Leeds United	Valley Parade
3	1923–24	3 November 1923	Division Two	Leeds United	1–0	Bradford City	Elland Road
4	1923–24	10 November 1923	Division Two	Bradford City	0–0	Leeds United	Valley Parade
5	1931–32	28 March 1932	Division Two	Bradford City	4–1	Leeds United	Valley Parade
6	1931–32	29 March 1932	Division Two	Leeds United	1–1	Bradford City	Elland Road
7	1985–86	21 September 1985	Division Two	Leeds United	2–1	Bradford City	Elland Road
8	1985–86	9 April 1986	Division Two	Bradford City	0–1	Leeds United	Valley Parade
9	1986–87	20 September 1986	Division Two	Bradford City	2–0	Leeds United	Valley Parade
10	1986–87	1 October 1986	Full Members' Cup	Leeds United	0–1	Bradford City	Elland Road
11	1986–87	28 February 1987	Division Two	Leeds United	1–0	Bradford City	Elland Road
12	1987–88	29 August 1987	Division Two	Bradford City	0–0	Leeds United	Valley Parade
13	1987–88	1 January 1988	Division Two	Leeds United	2–0	Bradford City	Elland Road
14	1988–89	26 October 1988	Division Two	Bradford City	1–1	Leeds United	Valley Parade
15	1988–89	1 March 1989	Division Two	Leeds United	3–3	Bradford City	Elland Road
16	1989–90	28 October 1989	Division Two	Bradford City	0–1	Leeds United	Valley Parade
17	1989–90	7 April 1990	Division Two	Leeds United	1–1	Bradford City	Elland Road
18	1998–99	28 October 1998	League Cup	Leeds United	1–0	Bradford City	Elland Road
19	1999–2000	20 November 1999	Premier League	Leeds United	2–1	Bradford City	Elland Road
20	1999–2000	12 March 2000	Premier League	Bradford City	1–2	Leeds United	Valley Road
21	2000–01	29 October 2000	Premier League	Bradford City	1–1	Leeds United	Valley Road
22	2000–01	13 May 2001	Premier League	Leeds United	6–1	Bradford City	Elland Road
23	2008–09	2 September 2008	EFL Trophy	Leeds United	2–1	Bradford City	Elland Road
24	2011–12	9 August 2011	League Cup	Leeds United	3–2	Bradford City	Elland Road
25	2014–15	27 August 2014	League Cup	Bradford City	2–1	Leeds United	Valley Parade

=== Bradford City and Huddersfield Town ===
Bradford City – Huddersfield Town
- Location: West Yorkshire, England
- Teams: Bradford City; Huddersfield Town
- First meeting: 11 September 1920 (Huddersfield Town 1–0 Bradford City)
- Latest meeting: 31 October 2026 (Bradford City 0–3 Huddersfield Town)
- Next meeting: 30 January 2027 (Huddersfield Town v Bradford City)
- Stadiums: Valley Parade; Kirklees Stadium Leeds Road

Statistics
- Total meetings: 55
- Most wins: Huddersfield Town (22)
- Largest victory: 12 August 2008 (Huddersfield Town 4–0 Bradford City)

Bradford City and Huddersfield Town have had roughly the same league status for the last couple of decades and so it could be argued that they are closest rivals out of the three West Yorkshire teams.

Matches against these sides have produced both amazing spectacles and some terrible moments—the 1996–97 season providing examples of both. On 1 February 1997, Huddersfield Town defender Kevin Gray broke the leg of Bradford City striker Gordon Watson in two places with a horrific sliding tackle. Watson was, at that time, the most expensive player in Bradford City's history having cost them £575,000, and was playing in only his third match for the club. He required a six-inch plate and seven screws in his leg. It took Gordon almost two years of recovery and five further operations before he was able to return to football, after which he made just a handful of appearances for City before leaving the club. At Leeds High Court in October 1998 he succeeded in becoming only the second player in the history of football to prove negligence by another player and was later awarded in excess of £900,000 in damages, making it "the most expensive tackle in British football and legal history".

The return fixture that season was a happier affair. It provided a spectacular display of goals in which City took a 3–0 lead, including one famous goal scored directly from a corner by ex-England star Chris Waddle, before the game swung in Huddersfield's favour as they fought back to the final score of 3–3.

The most recent derby was in League One, with The Terriers winning 3–0 on 31 October 2026.

==== Head-to-head record ====
Competition	Played	Bradford City	Draw	Huddersfield Town
League	45	15	14	16
FA Cup	2	0	0	2
League Cup	4	0	1	3
Football League Trophy	4	0	3	1
Totals	55	15	18	22

Current as of 31 October 2026. Statistics obtained from Soccerbase.

=== Leeds United and Huddersfield Town ===
Leeds United – Huddersfield Town
- Location: West Yorkshire, England
- Teams: Leeds United; Huddersfield Town
- First meeting: 27 September 1924 (Leeds United 1–1 Huddersfield Town)
- Latest meeting: 2 March 2024 (Huddersfield Town 1–1 Leeds United)
- Next meeting: TBA
- Stadiums: Elland Road; Kirklees Stadium Leeds Road

Statistics
- Total meetings: 83
- Most wins: Huddersfield Town (32)
- Largest victory: 15 September 1928 (Huddersfield Town 6–1 Leeds United); 5 October 1946 (Leeds United 5–0 Huddersfield Town)

Leeds United's best period of success was in the 1960s, and 1970s under the management of the legendary Don Revie. Between 1963 and 1975, Leeds became feared and respected across the country and in Europe. Revie guided them to two league championships, a FA Cup, one League Cup, two Inter-Cities Fairs Cups and a Charity Shield. Despite the success, Leeds had some notable disappointments, they were runners-up five times in the league, FA Cup finalists three times and UEFA Cup Winners Cup and European Cup finalists once. In 1992, Howard Wilkinson guided Leeds to their third top flight title, just two years after getting them promoted from the old Second Division, where they had played for eight years. Leeds also had sustained success in the Premier League, between 1997 and 2002 the club never finished outside of the top five and reached the UEFA Cup and Champions League semi-finals. However Leeds' success during this latter period came at a huge cost with tens of millions of pounds spent gambling on sustained Champions League involvement. When Leeds could only finish 5th in the 2001–02 season the clubs debt were around £80 million and a number of highly paid stars had to be sold to reduce the debt. By the end of the 2003–04 Premier League season, Leeds were relegated after 14 years in the top flight and three years later were relegated to League One and spent three years in the third tier before returning to the Championship at the end of the 2009–10 season. Leeds returned to the top flight in the 2020–21 season for the first time since 2004.

Huddersfield Town were the first team in English football to win the First Division title three times in a row back in the 1920s – a feat only matched by Liverpool, Manchester United and Arsenal – they also claimed the FA Cup, Charity Shield and finished as runners-up in the league three times in this period. Huddersfield spent 45 years outside of the top flight between 1972 and 2017. The Terriers had numerous promotions and relegations between the second, third and fourth tiers of English football. However, under their new manager David Wagner, Huddersfield won promotion to the Premier League for the first time by defeating Reading in the 2017 Championship play-off final.

==== Head-to-head record (including Leeds City) ====
Competition	Played	Huddersfield Town wins	Draw	Leeds United wins	Huddersfield Town goals	Leeds United goals
League	71	29	18	25	78	75
FA Cup	3	2	0	1	7	4
League Cup	7	1	2	4	7	9
Totals	81	32	19	25	92	88

Current as of 2 March 2024. Statistics obtained from Soccerbase.

=== Other rivalries ===
Bradford City historically have a fierce rivalry with other Bradfordian team Bradford (Park Avenue) A.F.C., which can also be considered a "West Yorkshire derby", however this is rivalry is commonly known as the "Bradford derby". Park Avenue were formerly an English Football League team until 1970.

FC Halifax Town, another West Yorkshire football team playing in the National League, consider Huddersfield Town to be one of their main rivals. They have played against each other when their predecessor, Halifax Town A.F.C., was in the Football League.

Farsley Celtic has a 'one-way' rivalry with Leeds United. They are based in the Leeds Metropolitan district however they have never reached the Football League.

In the Northern Premier League, matches between Liversedge and Ossett United are regularly played on a Friday night, and attract crowds of more than 1000, which is very high for this level of football.

== In rugby league ==
Rugby league is also big in West Yorkshire. The teams who are, or have been, in the Super League are; Bradford Bulls, Castleford Tigers, Halifax, Huddersfield Giants, Leeds Rhinos, and Wakefield Trinity. Other rugby league clubs in West Yorkshire are Batley Bulldogs, Dewsbury Rams, Featherstone Rovers, Hunslet and Keighley Cougars. Like football, the most commonly termed West Yorkshire derby has been between Leeds and Bradford (when they played in the same division), however any combination of West Yorkshire teams playing against each other could be called a West Yorkshire derby, even if the rivalry is not as great as other rivalries between teams in the area. Specific named derbies include the Calder Derby between Castleford and Wakefield, and the Heavy Woollen Derby between Batley and Dewsbury. In addition, the Leeds versus Wakefield rivalry also sees them compete in the Festive Challenge. Castleford versus Leeds has also become a more prominent derby in recent times.

=== Bradford Bulls and Leeds Rhinos ===
Bradford Bulls – Leeds Rhinos
- Location: West Yorkshire, England
- Teams: Bradford Bulls; Leeds Rhinos
- First meeting: 27 October 1906 (Bradford Bulls 21–5 Leeds Rhinos)
- Latest meeting: 28 January 2024 (Bradford Bulls 34–8 Leeds Rhinos)
- Stadiums: Headingley; Odsal Stadium

Statistics
- Total meetings: 142
- Most wins: Bradford Bulls (68)

The rivalry between the Leeds Rhinos and the Bradford Bulls was one of the great regular rivalries in English Rugby League and was commonly referred to as "The West Yorkshire Derby". The cities are next to one another and the teams have met in countless cup finals. During the early years of the Super League the rivalry peaked, with both Leeds and Bradford being dominant forces in Rugby League, challenging for numerous titles whilst meeting in Grand Finals and Challenge Cups. Bradford fell into financial trouble in 2011 and 2012, had not won or appeared in a final since 2005 and had to sell players to keep the club alive. The rivalry remains passionate despite Bradford's decline and Leeds continuing to win many more titles. Bradford were relegated in 2014, the first time in 40 years, ending competitive league fixtures between the sides. The most recent competitive meeting between the two sides was a Challenge Cup sixth round tie in May 2019, which Bradford won 24–22 to progress to the quarter finals.

==== Head-to-head record ====
Statistics correct as of 28 January 2024

In all competitions, competitive and uncompetitive:

Played	Bradford	Drawn	Leeds
142	68	8	66

==== Meetings in major finals ====
- 1946–47 Challenge Cup Final: Bradford 8–4 Leeds
- 2000 Challenge Cup Final: Bradford 24–18 Leeds
- 2003 Challenge Cup Final: Bradford 22–20 Leeds
- 2004 Super League Grand Final: Leeds 26–8 Bradford
- 2005 Super League Grand Final: Bradford 15–6 Leeds

==== Collective Honours ====
Bradford Bulls		Honour	Leeds Rhinos	
Rank	No.	Honour	No.	Rank
5th	6	League	11	3rd
7th	5	Challenge Cup	14	2nd
7th	1	Premiership	2	4th
3rd	2	League Cup	2	3rd
—N/a	0	Charity Shield	0	—N/a
3rd	3	World Club Challenge	3	3rd
11th	1	Yorkshire League	15	1st
3rd	11	Yorkshire Cup	17	1st
—N/a	0	BBC2 Floodlit Trophy	1	5th

=== Leeds Rhinos and Wakefield Trinity ===
Leeds Rhinos – Wakefield Trinity
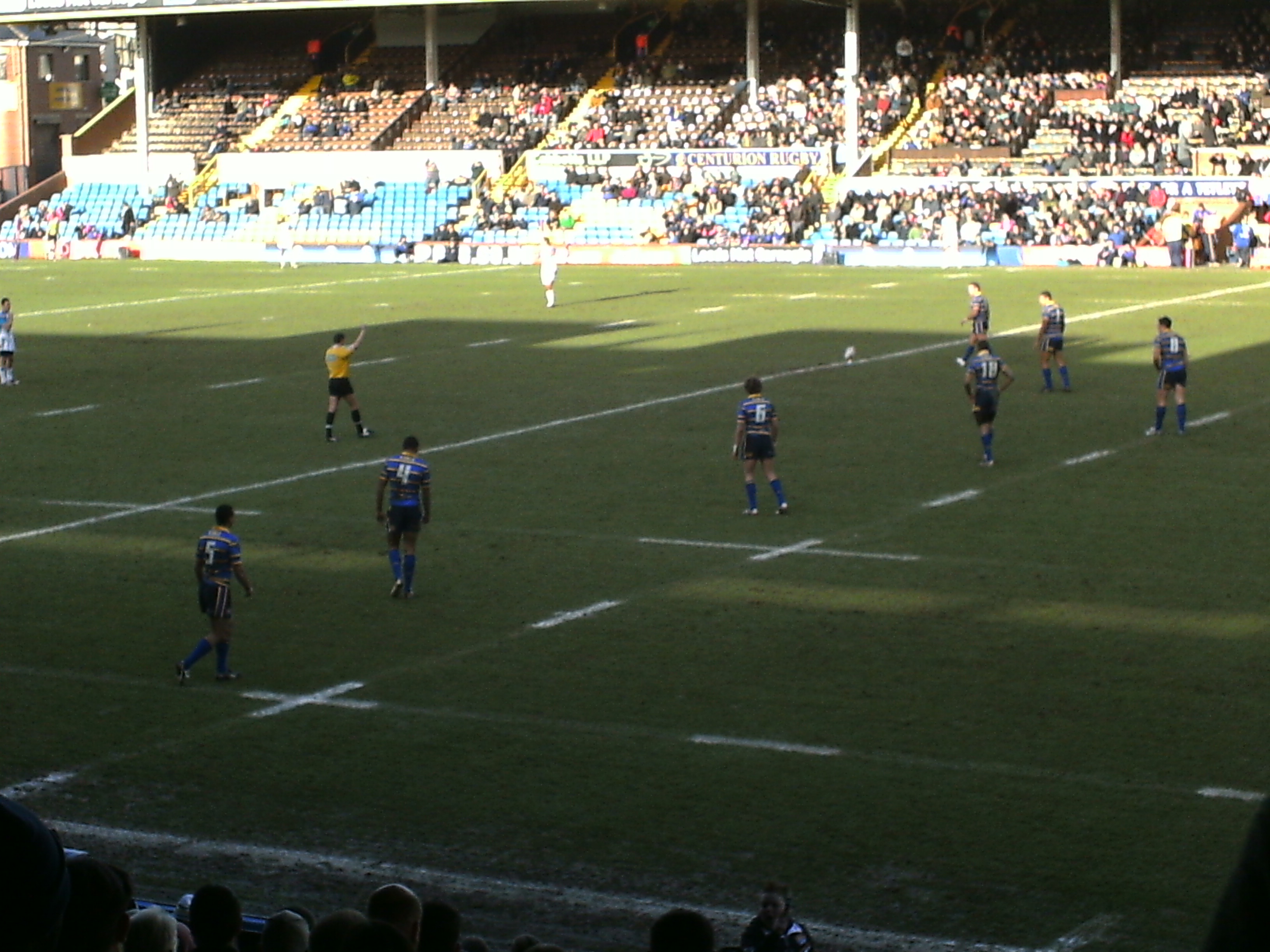
- The 2008 Festive Challenge
- Location: West Yorkshire, England
- Teams: Leeds Rhinos; Wakefield Trinity
- First meeting: 21 February 1903 (Leeds Rhinos 13–0 Wakefield Trinity)
- Latest meeting: 31 May 2025 (Leeds Rhinos 22-18 Wakefield Trinity)
- Stadiums: Headingley; Belle Vue

Statistics
- Total meetings: 130
- Most wins: Leeds Rhinos (87

==== Head-to-head record ====
Statistics correct as of 31 May 2025

In all competitions, competitive and uncompetitive:

Played	Leeds	Drawn	Wakefield
130	87	6	37

==== Meetings in major finals ====
- 1932–33 Yorkshire Cup Final: Leeds 8–0 Wakefield
- 1934–35 Yorkshire Cup Final: Leeds 5–5 Wakefield
  - Replay 1: Leeds 2–2 Wakefield
  - Replay 2: Leeds 13–0 Wakefield
- 1947–48 Yorkshire Cup Final: Wakefield 7–7 Leeds
  - Replay 1: Wakefield 8–7 Leeds
- 1958–59 Yorkshire Cup Final: Leeds 24–20 Wakefield
- 1961–62 Yorkshire Cup Final: Wakefield 19–9 Leeds
- 1964–65 Yorkshire Cup Final: Wakefield 18–2 Leeds
- 1967–68 Challenge Cup Final: Leeds 11–10 Wakefield
- 1973–74 Yorkshire Cup Final: Leeds 7–2 Wakefield

==== Collective Honours ====
As of the end of the 2021 season

Leeds Rhinos		Honour	Wakefield Trinity	
Rank	No.	Honour	No.	Rank
3rd	11	League Championships	2	14th
2nd	14	Challenge Cup	5	7th
4th	2	Premiership	0	—N/a
3rd	2	League Cup	0	—N/a
—N/a	0	Charity Shield	0	—N/a
3rd	3	World Club Challenge	0	—N/a
1st	15	Yorkshire League	7	3rd
1st	17	Yorkshire Cup	10	4th
5th	1	BBC2 Floodlit Trophy	0	—N/a

=== Castleford Tigers and Wakefield Trinity ===
Castleford Tigers – Wakefield Trinity The Calder Derby
- Location: West Yorkshire, England
- Teams: Castleford Tigers; Wakefield Trinity
- First meeting: 3 October 1934 (Wakefield Trinity 10–0 Castleford Tigers)
- Latest meeting: 5 September 2025 (Castleford Tigers 26–22 Wakefield Trinity)
- Stadiums: Wheldon Road; Belle Vue

Statistics
- Total meetings: 105
- Most wins: Wakefield Trinity (68)

The Calder Derby is contested between Castleford Tigers and Wakefield Trinity, with both Wakefield and Castleford being part of the City of Wakefield metropolitan borough, which the River Calder flows through.

Historically Wakefield have been the more successful side, winning two league titles and five Challenge Cups. However, Castleford have been the more successful side in recent years winning five out the six games played in the 2014 and 2015 season by large margins. In terms of silverware, Castleford have also been the most successful in modern times winning three Challenge Cups since 1969 and appearing in five finals. Wakefield have only appeared in one final during this period. In 2006, Wakefield Trinity and Castleford met on the final day of the Super League season with the losing team facing relegation to National League One. Wakefield would go on to win the match 29–17 which relegated Castleford.

==== Head-to-head record ====
Statistics correct as of 10 September 2025

In all competitions, competitive and uncompetitive:

Played	Castleford	Drawn	Wakefield
105	36	2	68

==== Meetings in major finals ====
- 1990–91 Yorkshire Cup Final: Castleford 11–8 Wakefield

==== Collective Honours ====
Castleford Tigers		Honour	Wakefield Trinity	
Rank	No.	Honour	No.	Rank
—N/a	0	League	2	14th
11th	4	Challenge Cup	5	7th
—N/a	0	Premiership	0	—N/a
3rd	2	League Cup	0	—N/a
—N/a	0	Charity Shield	0	—N/a
—N/a	0	World Club Challenge	0	—N/a
6th	3	Yorkshire League	7	3rd
6th	5	Yorkshire Cup	10	4th
1st	3	BBC2 Floodlit Trophy	0	—N/a

=== Castleford Tigers and Leeds Rhinos ===
Castleford Tigers – Leeds Rhinos
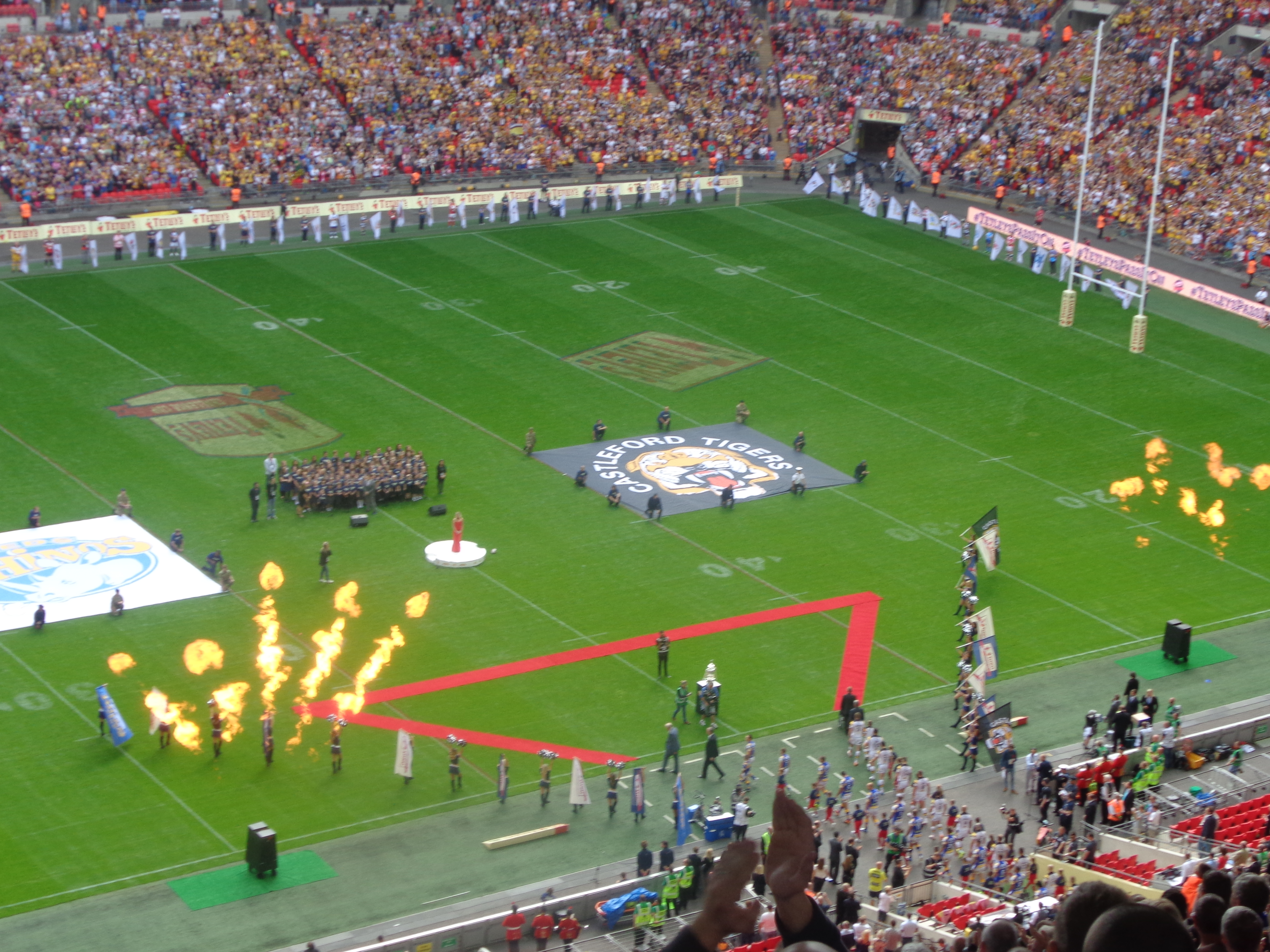
- Castleford Tigers face Leeds Rhinos at the 2014 Challenge Cup Final
- Location: West Yorkshire, England
- Teams: Castleford Tigers; Leeds Rhinos
- First meeting: 26 October 1932 (Leeds Rhinos 9–2 Castleford Tigers)
- Latest meeting: 16 August 2025 (Castleford Tigers 6–64 Leeds Rhinos)
- Stadiums: Headingley; Wheldon Road

Statistics
- Total meetings: 154
- Most wins: Leeds Rhinos (91)

==== Head-to-head record ====
Statistics correct as of 17 August 2025

In all competitions, competitive and uncompetitive:

Played	Castleford	Drawn	Leeds
154	56	7	91

==== Meetings in major finals ====
- 1968–69 Yorkshire Cup Final: Leeds 22–11 Castleford
- 1988–89 Yorkshire Cup Final: Leeds 32–12 Castleford
- 2014 Challenge Cup Final: Leeds 23–10 Castleford
- 2017 Super League Grand Final: Leeds 24–6 Castleford

==== Collective Honours ====
Castleford Tigers		Honour	Leeds Rhinos	
Rank	No.	Honour	No.	Rank
—N/a	0	League	11	3rd
11th	4	Challenge Cup	14	2nd
—N/a	0	Premiership	2	4th
3rd	2	League Cup	2	3rd
—N/a	0	Charity Shield	0	—N/a
—N/a	0	World Club Challenge	3	3rd
6th	3	Yorkshire League	15	1st
6th	5	Yorkshire Cup	17	1st
1st	3	BBC2 Floodlit Trophy	1	5th

=== Huddersfield Giants and Leeds Rhinos ===
Huddersfield Giants – Leeds Rhinos
- Location: West Yorkshire, England
- Teams: Huddersfield Giants; Leeds Rhinos
- First meeting: 29 March 1902 (Huddersfield Giants 11–0 Leeds Rhinos)
- Latest meeting: 4 September 2025 (Huddersfield Giants 0-28 Leeds Rhinos)
- Stadiums: Kirklees Stadium; Headingley

Statistics
- Total meetings: 100
- Most wins: Leeds Rhinos (56)

==== Head-to-head record ====
Statistics correct as of 5 September 2025

In all competitions, competitive and uncompetitive:

Played	Huddersfield	Drawn	Leeds
100	39	5	56

==== Meetings in major finals ====
- 1914–15 NRFU Grand Final: Huddersfield 35–2 Leeds
- 1919–20 Yorkshire Cup Final: Huddersfield 25–5 Leeds
- 1928–29 NRFL Grand Final: Huddersfield 2–0 Leeds
- 1929–30 NRFL Grand Final: Huddersfield 10–2 Leeds
- 1930–31 Yorkshire Cup Final: Leeds 10–2 Huddersfield
- 1937–38 Yorkshire Cup Final: Leeds 14–8 Huddersfield

==== Collective Honours ====
Huddersfield Giants		Honour	Leeds Rhinos	
Rank	No.	Honour	No.	Rank
4th	7	League	11	3rd
6th	6	Challenge Cup	14	2nd
—N/a	0	Premiership	2	4th
3rd	2	League Cup	2	3rd
—N/a	0	Charity Shield	0	—N/a
—N/a	0	World Club Challenge	3	3rd
2nd	11	Yorkshire League	15	1st
2nd	12	Yorkshire Cup	17	1st
—N/a	0	BBC2 Floodlit Trophy	1	5th

=== Other rivalries ===
In addition to the major rivalries listed above:

Since their relegation in 2014, the Bradford Bulls main local rivals in the RL Championship are the Halifax Panthers, their stadiums located within six miles of each other.

Leeds Rhinos share a fairly one-way rivalry with League 1 and fellow Leeds based side Hunslet. The lack of competitive fixtures sees Rhinos supporters view other West Yorkshire teams as greater rivals.

Similarly, Castleford and Wakefield both share a rivalry with Featherstone Rovers, but seen as Rovers have played most of their recent years in the Championship competitive fixtures are few and far between.

The Heavy Woollen Derby is contested by Championship sides Batley Bulldogs and Dewsbury Rams. This derby generally receives less attention that other West Yorkshire derbies due to it not taking place in the top tier of British rugby league.

Due to their proximity to East Lancashire, roses rivalries see Halifax Panthers and Huddersfield Giants also view Oldham Roughyeds and Rochdale Hornets as rivals. This has a higher presence in rugby than football partly due to historic roses competition and the limited popularity of rugby league outside of the two historic counties.

== See also ==
- List of sports rivalries in the United Kingdom
- List of association football rivalries in the United Kingdom
- Derbies in the Rugby Football League
- Bradford derby
