= Festive Challenge =

Annual British rugby match

The Festive Challenge
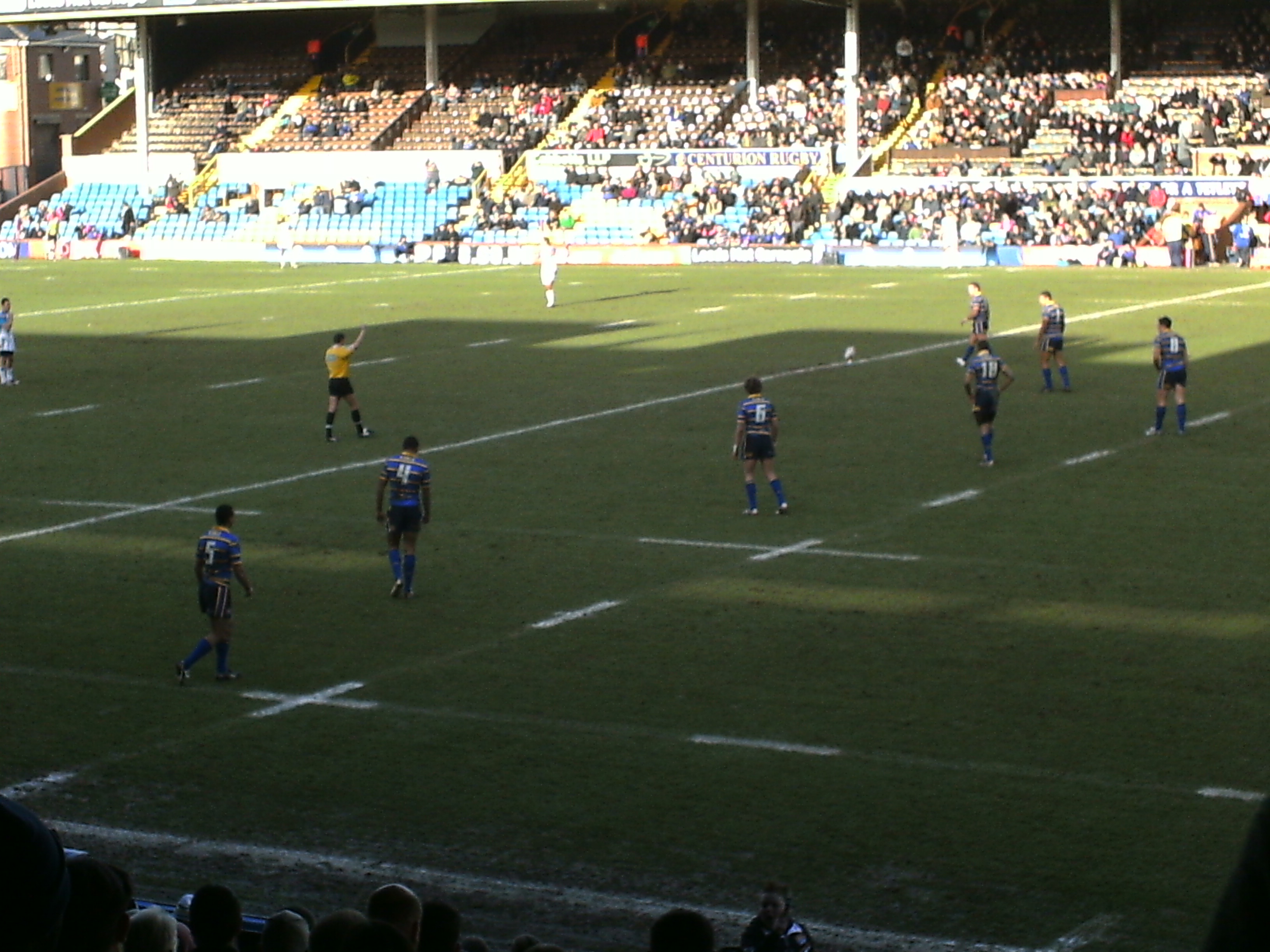
- The 2008 Festive Challenge
- Sport: Rugby league
- Number of teams: 2
- Country: (England) (RFL)
- Holders: Leeds Rhinos (14th title)
- Most titles: Leeds Rhinos (14 titles)

The Festive Challenge is an annual friendly rugby match played between Leeds Rhinos and Wakefield Trinity that is played on Boxing Day.

== History ==
=== Background ===
Matches played on Boxing Day were a regular part of rugby league season in Great Britain before the establishment of the Super League in 1996 and the switch to a summer season. Following the winter of 1962–1963, which caused the postponement of many sports fixtures, undersoil heating was installed at Headingley. This ensured that the surface would be playable for the 1963 Boxing Day match between Leeds and Wakefield, and led to the league schedule including a Leeds home fixture on Boxing Day every year apart from 1994 when they were away to Hull F.C. During this period Leeds faced numerous opponents, but the most frequent was Wakefield, who they faced a further ten times after 1963. In 1995, Leeds defeated Castleford at Headingley in their final competitive Boxing Day match before the move to the summer era.

=== Establishment ===
In 1996, Gary Hetherington, the recently appointed chief executive at Leeds, wanted to continue the tradition of a Boxing Day game so a friendly against Halifax was played as the first "festive challenge". In the following years Leeds played Halifax three more times and faced Bradford Bulls in 1999. Between 2001 and 2003 Leeds played Castleford Tigers and defeated them in all three matches.

=== Leeds and Wakefield ===
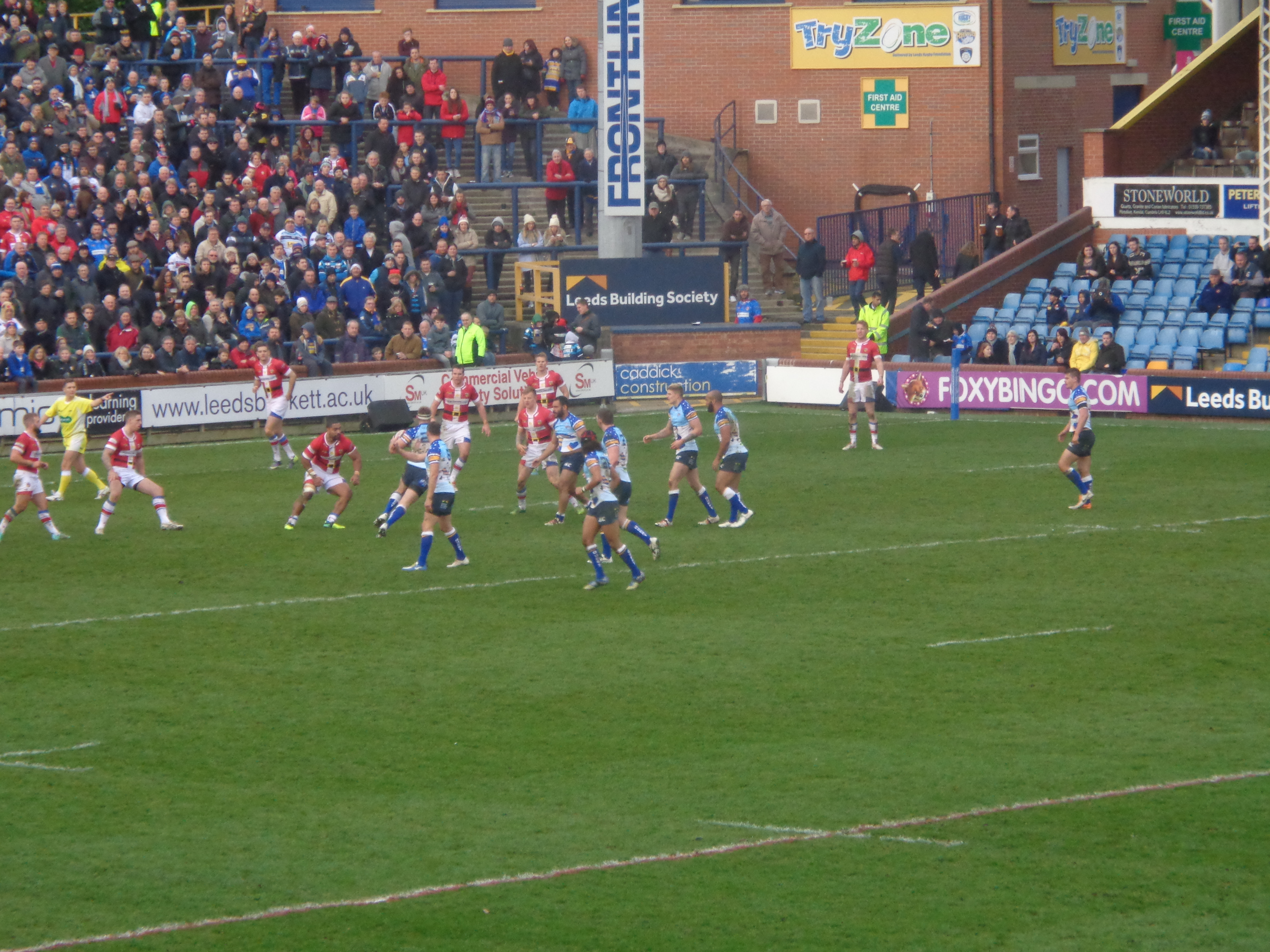
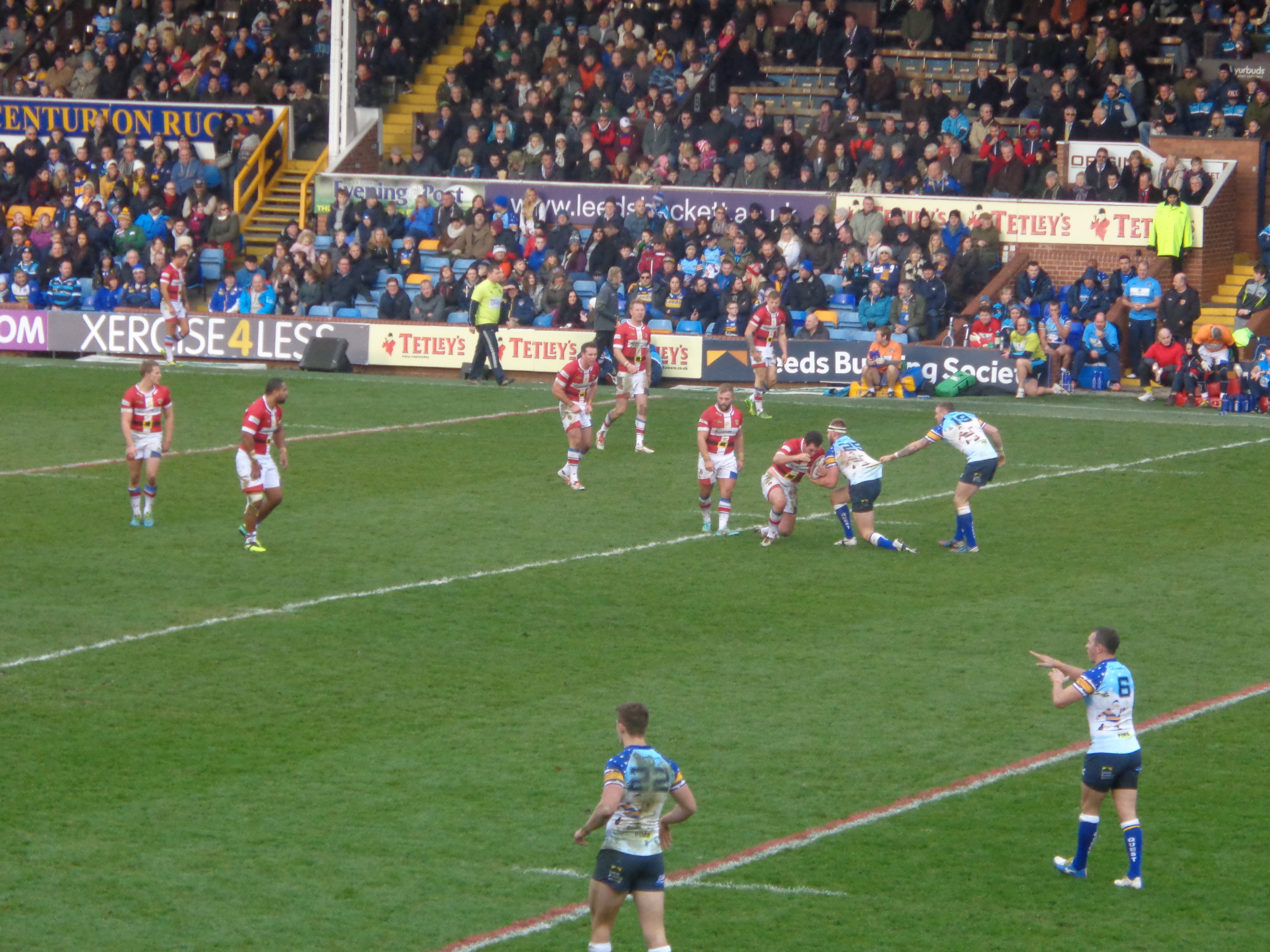
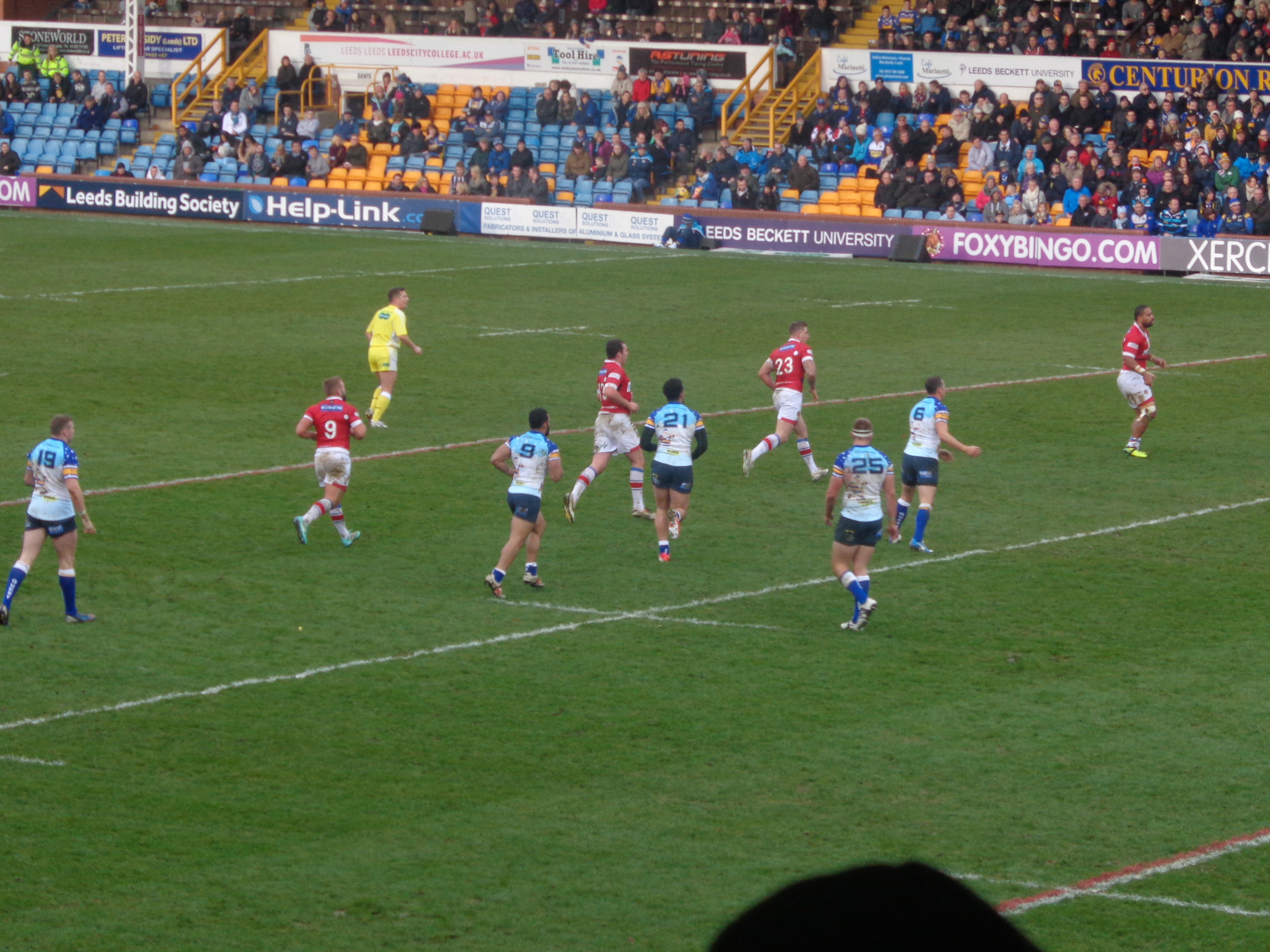
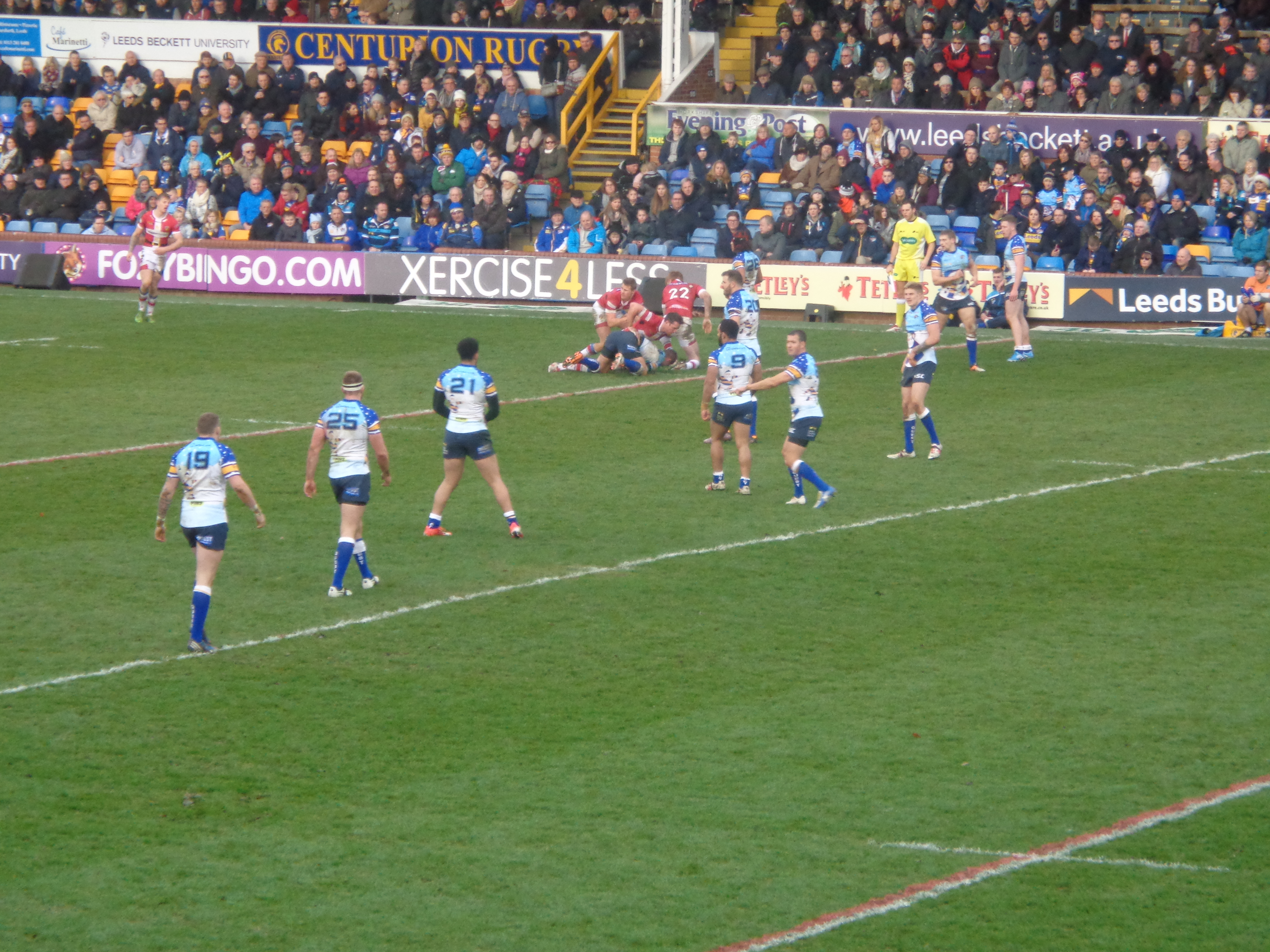
Festive Challenge 2014

The first festive challenge between Leeds and Wakefield was played in 2004.

The 2010 event was postponed to New Year's Day due to poor weather.

In 2017, the fixture was moved to Belle Vue, the first time it was played away from Headingley, due to the redevelopment of Headingley Stadium.

== Results ==
Year	Winner	Score	Runners up	Venue
2004	Leeds Rhinos	32–12	Wakefield Trinity Wildcats	Headingley Stadium
2005	Leeds Rhinos	42–18	Wakefield Trinity Wildcats	Headingley Stadium
2006	Leeds Rhinos	22–14	Wakefield Trinity Wildcats	Headingley Stadium
2007	Wakefield Trinity Wildcats	26–18	Leeds Rhinos	Headingley Stadium
2008	Wakefield Trinity Wildcats	22–16	Leeds Rhinos	Headingley Stadium
2009	Leeds Rhinos	32–12	Wakefield Trinity Wildcats	Headingley Stadium
2010 (Note: Postponed to New Year's Day 2011)	Leeds Rhinos	40–22	Wakefield Trinity Wildcats	Headingley Stadium
2011	Leeds Rhinos	26–10	Wakefield Trinity Wildcats	Headingley Stadium
2012	Leeds Rhinos	40–26	Wakefield Trinity Wildcats	Headingley Stadium
2013	Leeds Rhinos	18–18	Wakefield Trinity Wildcats	Headingley Stadium
2014	Leeds Rhinos	50–28	Wakefield Trinity Wildcats	Headingley Stadium
2015	Wakefield Trinity Wildcats	14–6	Leeds Rhinos	Headingley Stadium
2016	Wakefield Trinity	30–6	Leeds Rhinos	Headingley Stadium
2017	Leeds Rhinos	17–10	Wakefield Trinity	Belle Vue
2018	Leeds Rhinos	10–4	Wakefield Trinity	Headingley Stadium
2019	Wakefield Trinity	30–4	Leeds Rhinos	Headingley Stadium
2020	Cancelled due to the COVID-19 pandemic			
2021	Leeds Rhinos	34–6	Wakefield Trinity	Headingley Stadium
2022	Wakefield Trinity	32–20	Leeds Rhinos	Headingley Stadium
2023	Leeds Rhinos	41–22	Wakefield Trinity	Headingley Stadium
2024	Leeds Rhinos	18–16	Wakefield Trinity	Headingley Stadium
2025	Leeds Rhinos	18–10	Wakefield Trinity	Headingley Stadium

=== Winners ===
	Team	Wins	Years
1	Leeds Rhinos	14	2004, 2005, 2006, 2009, 2010, 2011, 2012, 2014, 2017, 2018, 2021, 2023, 2024, 2025
2	Wakefield Trinity	6	2007, 2008, 2015, 2016, 2019, 2022

== Sponsors ==
Period	Sponsor	Name
2009	Cravendale	Cravendale Festive Challenge
2011–2013	Heatshot	Heatshot Festive Challenge
2014	Tetley's	Tetley's Festive Challenge
2015–	Wetherby Whaler	Wetherby Whaler Festive Challenge

== See also ==
- Boxing Day Challenge
- West Yorkshire derbies
- Derbies in the Rugby Football League
