= Rivalries in the National Rugby League =

This is a list of rivalries in the National Rugby League.

== Traditional NSW Rivalries ==
=== Canterbury-Bankstown Bulldogs vs Parramatta Eels ===
The rivalry between Canterbury and Parramatta is one of the fiercest in the NRL.The two clubs have been geographically close throughout their whole histories.In the 1980s, Canterbury and Parramatta both won four premierships each and played against each other in two grand finals (1984,1986).In the 1990s, at the height of the Super League war, Parramatta signed four of Canterbury's star players, Jarrod McCracken, Dean Pay, Jim Dymock and Jason Smith, which helped Parramatta reach the finals for the first time in eleven years.In the 1998 preliminary final, Parramatta were winning against Canterbury 18–2 with less than 10 minutes to play when Canterbury staged one of the biggest finals comebacks, defeating Parramatta 32–20 in extra time.In 2009, Parramatta defeated Canterbury in the preliminary final to cap off a remarkable run to the grand final.The crowd that attended the match was a non-grand final record of 74,000 fans.Speaking of the rivalry in 2015, former Canterbury player James Graham said: "As soon as I came to this club, I was told that they were the closest club to us and that there was no love lost between players and fans".Andrew Ryan, who played for both clubs, said, "Both clubs do speak about the rivalry, in the change room and leading into the clashes, they always want to get the wood on their rival, I went for Canterbury when I was a kid, but then got my first opportunity in first grade to play for Parramatta. They place a huge amount of emphasis on the game. I think I was one of the only players to go the other way, a lot of players who had played for the Bulldogs played for Parramatta, not too many went the other way".

=== North Sydney Bears vs Manly-Warringah Sea Eagles ===
Prior to the ill-fated Northern Eagles joint venture from 2000 to 2002, the rivalry between Manly and foundation club Norths was arguably one of rugby league's fiercest.Manly were admitted to the premiership in 1947, with North Sydney at the time being one of the main advocates for a team in Manly.In Manly's first season, most of the side was made up of former Norths players including captain Max Whitehead who played for Norths in their 1943 grand final defeat to Newtown.The intense feelings between the two sides continued over the next couple of decades, fuelled as players switched between the two clubs.The biggest defection occurred in 1971 when Norths life member and one of the game's greatest wingers, Ken Irvine, joined Manly.Former Manly and North Sydney player Phil Blake said of the rivalry, "It was certainly a game you looked forward playing in.The ground was always packed and it was always a great afternoon".In 2016, Norths and Manly played their final competitive senior game against each other in the Intrust Super Premiership NSW competition, where Norths won the match 32–18. Manly had announced earlier in the 2016 season that they would be merging their lower-grade sides with the Blacktown Workers teams to become the Blacktown Workers Sea Eagles before Manly and Blacktown ended the partnership in 2024, seeing Manly's New South Wales Cup side readmitted into the competition in 2025. With the Bears set to rejoin the NRL in 2027 in Perth, the rivalry looks set to be reignited. Due to the circumstances surrounding the Northern Eagles in 2002 and the outcome resulting in North Sydney being without a side for 28 years following Manly taking the licence, the already fierce rivalry could be the biggest in the NRL moving forward.

=== Sydney Roosters vs St. George Illawarra Dragons ===
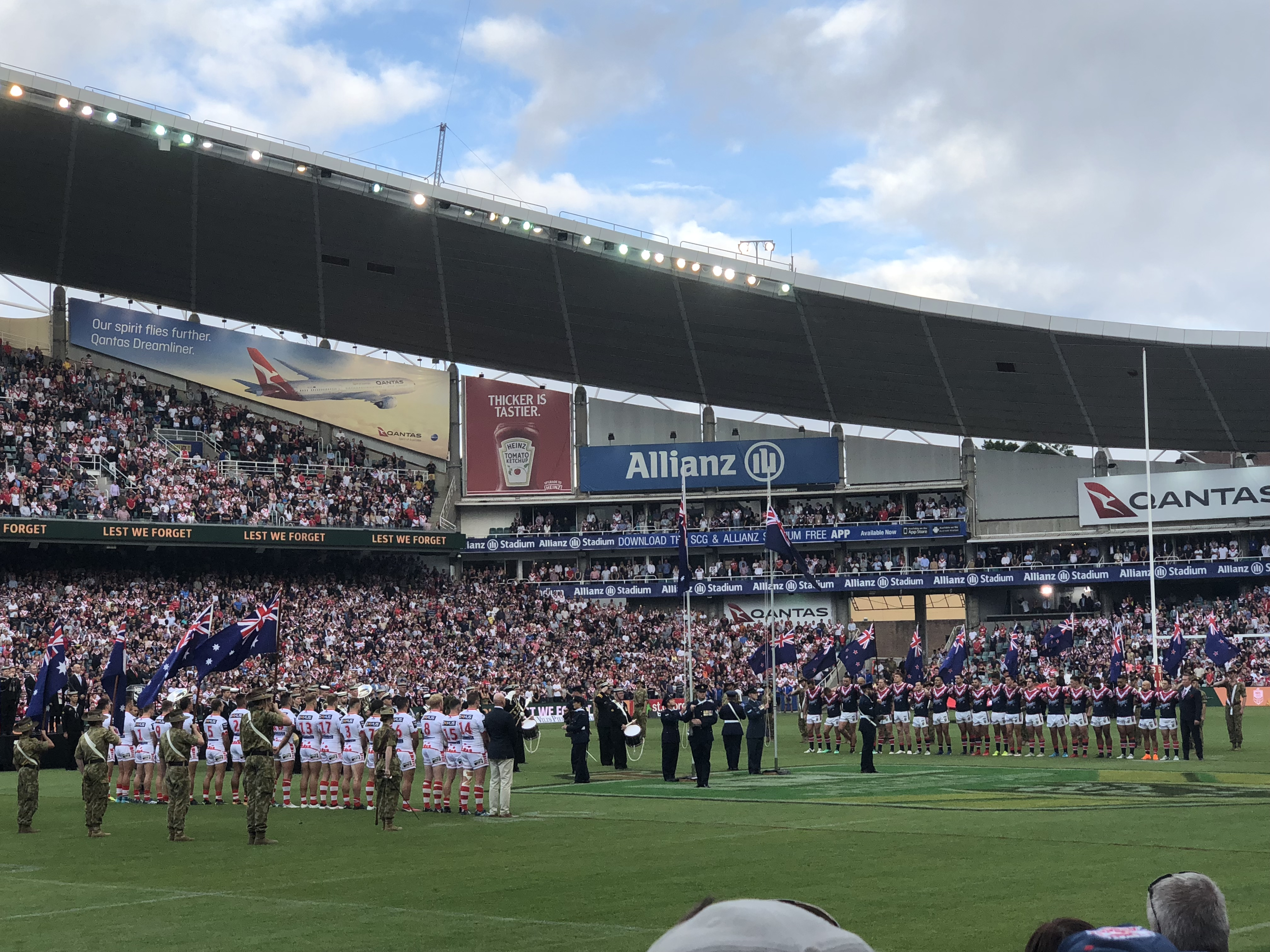
The pre-match formalities taking place prior to the Dragons vs Roosters Anzac Day clash in 2018.

These two clubs traditionally play each other in the ANZAC Day clash.

The first time the two clubs met in a finals match stretches back to 1927 when St. George defeated Eastern Suburbs 26–11 at Earl Park, Arncliffe.In the 1930 season, both teams played against each other in the semi-final with St. George running out winners 11–10.In 1933, St. George defeated Easts for the third time in a row during a finals game.In 1940, Eastern Suburbs finally managed to beat St. George in a finals game, winning 10-3, where they progressed to the grand final and defeated Canterbury-Bankstown.

The following year, St. George won their first premiership defeating Easts 31–14 at the Sydney Cricket Ground.It wasn't until the 1953 season that the two clubs met again, with St. George defeating Easts in the semi-final.In 1960, Eastern Suburbs reached their first grand final since 1945, where they faced St. George but were beaten 31–6.

In 1975, Eastern Suburbs defeated St. George 38–0 in the grand final, which until the 2008 NRL season was the biggest winning margin in a grand final.In the 1996 ARL season, the two clubs met in the semi-final with St. George winning 36–16 at the Sydney Football Stadium.

After St. George formed a joint venture with the Illawarra Steelers in 1999 to form St. George Illawarra the two club's have met each other twice in finals matches, the first coming in 1999 which St. George won and in the 2010 NRL Grand Final where St. George won their first premiership as a joint venture defeating the Sydney Roosters 32–8 at ANZ Stadium.

=== South Sydney Rabbitohs vs St. George Illawarra Dragons ===
South Sydney and St. George have met in several Grand Finals many times throughout their history, and share the same geographical area, which is Sydney's inner-southern suburbs.The first time the two clubs met was in the 1927 NSWRL Grand Final, which Souths won 20–11 at the Sydney Agricultural Ground.In 1949, St. George would win their second premiership defeating Souths 19–12 at the Sydney Cricket Ground.Souths would then gain revenge by defeating St. George in the 1953 final. In 1965, St. George won their tenth premiership in a row, defeating Souths 12–8 in front of a packed Sydney Cricket Ground, with crowd estimates as high as 200,000 (the official attendance was 78,056).The last time the two clubs met in a grand final was in 1971 when Souths won their 20th premiership defeating Saints 16–10.This would be South's last premiership until winning the 2014 NRL Grand Final.

The Charity Shield was contested between these two clubs throughout the 1980s and 1990s; in 2002, it was revived after Souths were readmitted into the competition.In 2001, South Sydney chairman and club legend George Piggins said there would be no chance of the Charity Shield being revived if Souths were to be included back into the NRL, saying "The Dragons: They sold us out".This was in reference to St. George signing an affidavit, which included that it would be detrimental if Souths were returned to the competition.

The match is always played as a pre-season fixture.In 2018, both sides met for the first time in a finals match since 1984. After 80 tense minutes of absorbing action, Souths won a close semi-final 13–12 in front of over 48,000 at ANZ Stadium.

=== Sydney Roosters vs Canterbury-Bankstown Bulldogs ===
The Sydney Roosters have a long-standing rivalry with fellow Sydney team, the Canterbury-Bankstown Bulldogs. Whilst both teams had crossed premiership paths in Grand Finals on five occasions.

In 1938, Canterbury-Bankstown won their first premiership against Eastern Suburbs, as they were known as back then, winning 19–6 at the Sydney Cricket Ground. Two years later, in 1940, the sides met again, with Easts winning the 1940 grand final 24–14. In 1974, Eastern Suburbs broke a 30-plus-year drought, defeating Canterbury-Bankstown 19–4. In 1980, Canterbury-Bankstown broke a 38-year premiership drought, defeating Eastern Suburbs 18–4 at the Sydney Cricket Ground.

In 2002, the Sydney Roosters won the 2002 NRL Premiership on the back of a 9-game winning streak. This was the same year the premiership favourite Bulldogs were stripped of 37 points due to systematic breaches of the salary cap in the 2001 and the 2002 seasons. In 2003, the Roosters proved themselves worthy of their Defending Premiers title when they defeated Canterbury in the Preliminary Final 28–18 in front of a sold-out Aussie Stadium.

In 2004, the Roosters defeated Canterbury 35-0, and fighting broke out in the stands during and after the game had been completed. While the Roosters finished the regular season with the Minor Premiership, Canterbury defeated them in the Grand Final 16–13 after trailing 13–6 at half-time.

As of the 2022 NRL season, the last time the two clubs met in a finals game was the 2015 elimination final which the Sydney Roosters won 38–12 at the Sydney Football Stadium.

=== St. George Illawarra Dragons vs Parramatta Eels ===
The rivalry between St. George and Parramatta stretches back to 1977 when St. George and Parramatta played out the first ever drawn Grand Final result. Parramatta, seeking their first ever premiership after having finished on top of the ladder at the end of the regular season, were beaten 22–0 in the replay by the Dragons, which won its first premiership since 1966.

There have recently been some controversial matches between the Dragons and the Eels. Firstly, in Round 18, 2005, the Eels won 40–14 in a match which saw Trent Barrett and PJ Marsh trade blows after Marsh's crude charge-down attempt at Barrett, sparking an all-in brawl whilst the Eels' Wade McKinnon sprinted to score a match-turning 80-metre try.

A less memorable match saw no points scored between the two teams in Round 13, 2006, in the first 70 minutes of play before the Eels slotted a field goal with nine minutes remaining, before the Dragons struck back with two one-pointers to take a 2–1 lead. The Dragons then scored a try through Matt Cooper with mere seconds remaining on the clock to claim an 8–1 victory.

In the 2009 finals series, St George finished as minor premiers and faced a Parramatta side who finished eighth on the ladder.A week earlier at the same venue, St George had defeated Parramatta 37-0, but in the finals game, Parramatta won 25–12 with Parramatta player Jarryd Hayne scoring a brilliant solo try.As of the 2022 NRL season, this is the last time the two sides have played against each other in the finals.

=== Manly-Warringah Sea Eagles vs Parramatta Eels ===
Manly and Parramatta have built a fierce rivalry since the 1970s. They met in the 1976 Grand Final, in which Manly denied the Parramatta club a maiden premiership. However, the Eels won both the 1982 and 1983 Grand Finals against Manly. Since the 1983 grand final, Parramatta and Manly have only played against each other in one other finals game, which was in 2005 when Parramatta finished as minor premiers, and Manly finished in eighth place. Parramatta won the match 46–22.

On 18 May 2003, Parramatta and Manly played in the first-ever golden point match in NRL history. Manly would win the match 36–34 at Brookvale Oval courtesy of a Ben Walker penalty goal. In round 2 of the 2018 NRL season, Parramatta suffered its worst-ever loss to Manly.The game was played in temperatures of nearly 40 degrees, where Manly ran out 54–0 winners. In the 2019 NRL season, Parramatta beat Manly in round 25 to take Manly's fifth spot on the ladder and would go on to beat Brisbane 58–0 in the elimination final.The victory is currently the biggest win in finals history. In round 11 of the 2022 NRL season, Manly lead Parramatta by ten points in the second half before Parramatta scored two tries to make it 20-20. Parramatta player Mitchell Moses then converted a goal from the sideline to win the match 22–20. In round 21 of the 2022 NRL season, the two sides met at Brookvale Oval, where Manly needed to defeat Parramatta if they were to stand any chance of reaching the finals.Parramatta would win the game 36–20 with the maligned Jakob Arthur providing two try assists for Parramatta, which ended Manly's finals hopes.

Since the 2000s, the rivalry has seen numerous player swaps or players who have featured for both clubs, which in the early days was a rare occurrence of the fixture. Such players who have been at both clubs since 2000 include Jamie Lyon, Daniel Heckenberg, Shayne Dunley, Kylie Leuluai, Michael Witt, Aaron Cannings, Jack Afamasaga, Feleti Mateo, Richard Faʻaoso, Blake Green, Joe Galuvao, Tony Williams, Jeff Robson, Jonathan Wright, Justin Horo, Chris Hicks, Cheyse Blair, Darcy Lussick, Kelepi Tanginoa, Brayden Wiliame, Daniel Harrison, William Hopoate, David Gower, Anthony Watmough, Clinton Gutherson, Kieran Foran, Siosaia Vave, Shaun Lane, Andrew Davey, Joey Lussick, Michael Oldfield and Jake Arthur.

=== Manly-Warringah Sea Eagles vs Cronulla-Sutherland Sharks ===
This rivalry has been dubbed the "Battle of the Beaches", and they met in a brutal Grand Final in 1973, which was described as the dirtiest and toughest Grand Final of them all.The rivalry between the two sides has been described as one of the most one-sided in the competition, with Manly having won 67 matches as opposed to Cronulla's 25 matches. Manly defeated Cronulla 16–0 in the 1978 Grand Final replay after the original contest had ended in an 11–11 draw. In 1996, Manly and Cronulla played each other in the 1996 preliminary final, where Manly defeated Cronulla 24–0. In the 2013 finals series, the two clubs met at the Sydney Football Stadium with Manly running out 24–18 winners.In week one of the 2019 finals series, Manly defeated Cronulla to win the game 28–16 at Brookvale Oval and eliminate Cronulla from the finals race.

=== South Sydney Rabbitohs vs Sydney Roosters ===
The rivalry between the Sydney Roosters and the South Sydney Rabbitohs rugby league teams is regarded as the fiercest in the NRL and the oldest continuing rivalry with both clubs founded in 1908 and both sides still competing as stand alone entities in the NRL. The rivalry increased after 1950 due to conflict between junior territories, and escalated once more in the 1990s with the increased financial success of the Roosters eclipsing the decreasing funds of the Rabbitohs. In 2005, South Sydney broke a ten-year, thirteen-game losing streak to the Roosters in a close 17–16 match. In the final round of 2013, the Roosters defeated Souths to claim the Minor Premiership, a feat they repeated the following year. In 2014, Souths defeated the Sydney Roosters in the preliminary final to reach their first grand final in 43 years.The rivalry has also seen a number of player swaps over the years most notably with Ron Coote, Elwyn Walters, Craig Wing, Bryan Fletcher, Chris Walker, Shannon Hegarty, Ashley Harrison, Luke Keary, Angus Crichton, Daniel Suluka-Fifita Brandon Smith and Latrell Mitchell. In 2018, the Sydney Roosters defeated Souths 12–4 in the preliminary final at Allianz Stadium, which was the last game to be played at the venue.The crowd of 44,380 was also a ground record. In 2019, the two clubs met in the qualifying final, which was played at the Sydney Cricket Ground.South Sydney had beaten the Sydney Roosters only a week prior in the final game of the regular season, but in the qualifying final, the Roosters won the match 30–6 in a dominant display.

In 2020, the Sydney Roosters managed to record a victory over South Sydney 28–12 in round 3.In the final round of the 2020 NRL season, Souths defeated the Sydney Roosters 60–8.This was the biggest win South Sydney had ever recorded over their rivals, eclipsing the previous score set in 1952 when Souths defeated Eastern Suburbs 52–0.

Before round 25 of the 2022 NRL season where the two sides were to meet, Sydney Roosters CEO Nick Politis issued a warning to South Sydney stating that the new Sydney Football Stadium has always been the home ground and territory of the Eastern Suburbs club and not South Sydney.Souths had declared they wanted to leave Stadium Australia and make the new Sydney Football Stadium as their home ground.Politis said to Fox Sports, "I’ve heard other people say they want to play there because it’s their home, The point is we’ve been there since 1928. We started with the old sports ground and then 30 years with the old Allianz Stadium, Nobody else has played there. For another club to say we want to go there because it’s our home, it’s not their home. The Roosters are the only people that belong there. It’s our true home and it’s very sacred".

Despite Politis' claims, the South Sydney club had used the Sydney Sports Ground as a home ground before Eastern Suburbs, and the two clubs often shared grounds for the first 30 years of their existence at the venue. In the 2022 elimination final, seven players were sin-binned, which was the most in an NRL era game as South Sydney upset the Sydney Roosters 30-14, ending their season. In the last round of the 2023 NRL season, the Sydney Roosters defeated South Sydney 26–12 to end their season and deny them a finals spot. Before the match started, both sides knew whoever lost the game would miss out on the finals. In round 3 of the 2024 NRL season, the Sydney Roosters recorded their second-biggest win over South Sydney since 1908, beating them 48–6.

In 2025, South Sydney announced their intentions of relocating their home matches to the new Sydney Football Stadium, which caused outrage amongst Sydney Roosters supporters. On 17 June 2025, South Sydney's bid to move to the stadium was rejected by the NSW Government.

In round 2 of the 2026 NRL season, South Sydney winger Alex Johnston broke Ken Irvine's long-standing try scoring record in the NRL during their match against the Sydney Roosters. This sparked a pitch invasion by supporters of both clubs. In the final round of the 2026 regular season, South Sydney defeated the Sydney Roosters 50-20 in a match where the Sydney Roosters rested most of their players before the finals. The match also saw Jai Arrow make his 100th appearance for South Sydney just before the start of play. Arrow had been diagnosed with Motor Neurone Disease earlier that year.

=== St. George Illawarra Dragons vs Cronulla-Sutherland Sharks ===
A rivalry exists between the St. George Illawarra Dragons and the Cronulla-Sutherland Sharks, which share the same geographic region. Cronulla were viewed as St George's "little brother" from 1967 to 1998. The St. George Dragons and now the St. George Illawarra Dragons have enjoyed more success than Cronulla, who remained premiership-less since their inception in 1967 until 2016 when they won 14–12 against the Melbourne Storm, while St. George managed to win their first title as a joint venture after eleven years in the competition, with the original St. George winning fifteen titles.

In fact, since the joint venture entered the competition in 1999, both clubs have finished higher than another six times apiece. On ANZAC Day 1999, Cronulla CEO Peter Gow famously cut up a St. George jersey with a pair of scissors in front of onlookers at Cronulla's leagues club and assaulted former St. George player Barry Beath who had become involved in the situation. Gow was later sacked by Cronulla for defacing the jersey and for assaulting a club patron. Cronulla finished the 1999 season as minor premiers, but St George beat them 24–8 in the preliminary final to progress to the 1999 NRL Grand Final at Cronulla's expense. The Dragons trailed 8–0 at halftime. In the 2002 finals series, both teams met in the semi-final, which Cronulla won 40–24 at the Sydney Football Stadium.The rivalry increased further in 2005 when they met in a qualifying final at a sold-out WIN Stadium with the Dragons winning 28–22.As of the 2022 NRL season, this is the last time the two clubs have played each other in a finals game. In round 18 of the 2023 NRL season, Cronulla recorded their biggest ever victory over either St. George or St. George Illawarra, defeating the latter 52–16.

=== Parramatta Eels vs Penrith Panthers ===
Parramatta entered the NSWRL (now NRL) competition in 1947, and Penrith entered 20 years later in 1967.Parramatta are the closest NRL team to Penrith geographically. The match between the two is known as the "Western Sydney derby" or "The Battle of the West". Aside from local 'bragging rights' the rivalry is also partly founded in bitterness associated with the former status of the Penrith district as part of the Parramatta rugby league district. The relationship between local Penrith clubs and the Parramatta District was often problematic; players and officials in the Penrith area considered themselves ignored and neglected by the Parramatta club during the 1950s and 1960s. Parramatta beat Penrith in two finals games in 1985, winning 38-6, and in 2000, when Parramatta won again 28–10. In 2021, Penrith beat Parramatta in a tight and bruising affair 8–6 on their way to winning the 2021 Grand Final.

In round 9 of the 2022 NRL season, Parramatta defeated Penrith 22–20 at Penrith Stadium. This ended Penrith's eight match winning streak to start the season and it was also the first time Penrith had lost at the ground since the 2019 NRL season. In round 20 of the same season, Parramatta defeated Penrith 34–10.Parramatta were the only team in the 2022 NRL season to beat Penrith twice.In the 2022 finals series, Penrith defeated Parramatta 27–8 in the qualifying final.The two clubs would then meet in the 2022 NRL Grand Final with Penrith securing back-to-back premierships, defeating Parramatta 28–12.Following the grand final, some of the Penrith players mocked the Parramatta club in public and on social media with James Fisher-Harris saying that Parramatta were now Penrith's sons followed by the player inviting Penrith supporters to chant "We hate Parra" and Jarome Luai posting on social media "Daddy loves you" which was in reference to Luai saying before the grand final that Penrith were now Parramatta's "Daddy".

In round 4 of the 2023 NRL season, Parramatta met Penrith in the grand final rematch. Parramatta went into the game having started the season winless. Parramatta led the match 16–8 with less than seven minutes to play, but Penrith managed to level the game at 16–16 after Nathan Cleary kicked a 40-metre field goal with seconds remaining. In golden point extra-time, Mitchell Moses kicked a field goal to win the game for Parramatta 17–16.

=== St. George Illawarra Dragons vs Canterbury-Bankstown Bulldogs ===
St George Illawarra has a fierce rivalry with its neighbour the Canterbury-Bankstown Bulldogs. Canterbury-Bankstown were founded in 1935, 14 years after St George. St. George inflicted a premiership record 91–6 defeat of Canterbury in 1935, but Canterbury enjoyed premiership success first in 1938, and St George in 1941. In the 1942 NSWRFL season, the two clubs met in the 1942 grand final with Canterbury-Bankstown defeating St. George 11–9 in a low-scoring affair at the Sydney Cricket Ground.After that, however, St. George recorded 11 straight premierships in the years following (1955–1966). It was also Canterbury who put an end to their Premiership run in 1967, when they beat them by a point in the preliminary final to face South Sydney in the Grand Final. Since then, both clubs inflicted Premiership defeats on the other, St George defeating Canterbury in their last Grand Final success in 1979, Canterbury returning the favour in 1985.

The two teams subsequently met in the 1993 preliminary final, which St. George won 27–12.They would meet again in the 1995 and 1998 finals series, with Canterbury running out winners on both occasions.The elimination final in 1998 was also St. George's final game as a stand-alone entity as the club elected to form a joint venture with Illawarra for the 1999 NRL season.

Canterbury superstar Sonny Bill Williams walked out on the club just before a match against the St. George. The match also marked the first-grade debut of future Dally M Medallist Ben Barba.

Since St. George formed a joint venture with Illawarra, the two clubs have met each other in the 2001 finals series, which St. George Illawarra defeated Canterbury 23-22 and in the 2015 finals series, which Canterbury won 11–10 at ANZ Stadium.In the 2017 NRL season, St. George Illawarra needed to beat Canterbury in the final game of the regular season to qualify for the finals.Canterbury, who were already out of contention for the finals, defeated St. George 26-20, which allowed North Queensland to get the last finals spot and finish eighth.North Queensland would then go on to reach the 2017 NRL Grand Final as a result.

=== South Sydney Rabbitohs vs Canterbury-Bankstown Bulldogs ===
Souths and Canterbury-Bankstown have played each other every Good Friday since 2012. They met in the 1967 NSWRFL Grand Final with South Sydney winning 12–10. However, their rivalry intensified when they met in the 2014 NRL Grand Final where Souths won 30–6 to claim their first premiership since 1971. During their Good Friday clash in 2015, this game was labelled for its controversy, as South Sydney won 18-17 thanks to a late penalty goal. Canterbury fans were angry about the match official's decision and attacked the match officials when they walked off the field, throwing bottles at them, even causing one of them to slip over. Some fans were given lifetime bans for throwing bottles at the match officials.

In round 4 of the 2021 NRL season, Canterbury were defeated 38–0 by South Sydney in the traditional Good Friday game.Canterbury became only the second team in the NRL era to lose three straight games without scoring a point after Cronulla, who achieved this in the 2014 NRL season.

It was also the worst start to a season by any team since Glebe in the 1928 NSWRFL season, who managed to only score 12 points in their first four matches. In round 6 of the 2023 NRL season, South Sydney recorded the most points scored by a winning team in the Good Friday game as they defeated Canterbury 50–16. As of the 2024 NRL season, the two clubs have only met each other in the finals four times.

Despite the game being considered a rivalry by some supporters, Canterbury were one of the only teams after Souths were expelled from the league who were in favour of the club being readmitted to the NRL.

=== South Sydney Rabbitohs vs Manly Warringah Sea Eagles ===
The competitive rivalry between South Sydney and Manly Warringah is very historic and continues to this day. South Sydney and Manly-Warringah first met in the 1951 NSWRFL season's Grand Final. South Sydney would win the match 42-14, which, as of 2022, is the highest scoring grand final in NSWRL/NRL history. The clubs would then meet again in the 1968 and 1970 grand finals, which South Sydney both won.

In the 2013 preliminary final, Souths were looking to reach their first grand final since 1971 when they faced off against Manly. Souths lead the match 14-0 early on but were eventually defeated by Manly 30–20. In the 2020 NRL season, South Sydney recorded a 56–16 victory over Manly, which was their biggest loss against any team since 2005.

In the 2021 NRL season, South Sydney and Manly once again met in the preliminary final but on this occasion South Sydney ran out comfortable winners to reach the 2021 NRL Grand Final. In round 4 of the 2023 NRL season, South Sydney defeated Manly 13–12 in golden point extra-time courtesy of a field goal by Lachlan Ilias.

Manly have, since 1970, purchased many of Souths' star players including John O'Neill, Ray Branighan, Ian Roberts, and more recently Dylan Walker.

== Queensland Rivalries ==
=== Brisbane Broncos vs North Queensland Cowboys ===
Between 1999 and 2006 inclusive, these two clubs were the only clubs from Queensland playing in the National Rugby League. In the early days, Brisbane would always beat North Queensland either in Brisbane or Townsville, where North Queensland are based. North Queensland would not record their first victory until the 2004 NRL season where they defeated Brisbane 10–0 in the semi-final at Dairy Farmers Stadium.

In the 2012 NRL season, the two sides met in the elimination final, which North Queensland won 33–16. North Queensland and Brisbane would meet in another elimination final during the 2014 NRL season, which North Queensland won 32–20.

They met in the 2015 NRL Grand Final on 4 October at ANZ Stadium. This game is often regarded as one of the best grand finals ever, with Johnathan Thurston kicking a field goal in golden point to win North Queensland's first ever premiership.Following the 2015 final, the two clubs played four matches in succession where the game was decided by six points or less.

In the final round of the 2020 NRL season, Brisbane, who were running last, had the opportunity to avoid their first ever wooden spoon if they could defeat North Queensland, who were sitting in 14th position.North Queensland would go on to defeat Brisbane 32–16 at Suncorp Stadium and condemn Brisbane to the wooden spoon.

=== Brisbane Broncos vs Gold Coast Titans ===
The South East Queensland derby started in 2007 with the admission of the Gold Coast into the NRL. That year in Round 17, Darren Lockyer kicked a monumental field goal that hit both uprights and gave the Broncos a 19–18 victory in front of over 40,000 spectators at Suncorp Stadium.

The two clubs also met in the 2010 Finals with the Brisbane side winning 40–32 in the week one match-up on the Titans' turf at Skilled Park in front of a sellout crowd. The next finals meeting between the clubs came in 2016, with Brisbane again winning, this time 44–28. The match saw a contentious penalty try awarded to Broncos winger Jordan Kahu, where the ball was kicked from his hands. In 2018, the lowly Gold Coast side beat Brisbane at Suncorp Stadium 26–14 on Easter Sunday, which was regarded as a major upset at the time. In round 12 of the 2022 NRL season, Brisbane came from 24–4 down at half-time to defeat the Gold Coast 35–24. Brisbane has a superior record in the fixture, having won 23 of the 33 meetings.

=== Brisbane Broncos vs Dolphins ===
The Battle of Brisbane is a rivalry that began with the Dolphins' admission as the second Brisbane club in 2023. This marked the first time that Brisbane has had two professional rugby league teams since the demise of the South Queensland Crushers in 1997. In round 4 of the 2023 NRL season, the two sides played against each other for the first time. In a match which saw both sides take the lead, Brisbane would go on to win 18–12 in front of 51,047 fans. This was the biggest crowd at Suncorp Stadium for a regular season game in its history.

=== Gold Coast Titans vs Dolphins ===
The Sunshine Showdown is a new rivalry that began with the Dolphins' entry into the NRL in 2023. The Titans have only defeated the Dolphins once.

== Interstate Rivalries ==
=== Manly-Warringah Sea Eagles vs Melbourne Storm ===
This is regarded as one of the biggest rivalries in the modern era, and the two clubs met in the 2007 and 2008 Grand Finals.

After Manly had gone on to win the 2011 premiership, both teams fought out the 2012 preliminary final in Melbourne. Melbourne defeated Manly 40–12, ending their chances of winning back-to-back titles. Melbourne would go on to win their second legitimate premiership after being stripped of their 2007 and 2009 premierships after the NRL discovered systematic salary cap rorting by the club.

After nine years without playing each other in the finals, Manly and Melbourne met in week one of the 2021 NRL finals series where Melbourne won the match 40–12 at the Sunshine Coast Stadium.

=== Cronulla-Sutherland Sharks vs Melbourne Storm ===
A fairly recent rivalry that reached its height in the 2016 NRL Grand Final, which was won by Cronulla.

Round 2 of the 2008 NRL season saw the sides meet at Olympic Park in Melbourne, and Cronulla was able to reverse the result by the same scoreline via a Brett Kimmorley field goal. The match was marred by an ugly brawl, which saw Cronulla's Ben Ross and Melbourne's Brett White sent from the field. It was the only loss Melbourne suffered at home during the 2008 regular season.

The two sides met again in the preliminary final, where Melbourne, despite missing captain Cameron Smith due to suspension, defeated Cronulla 28–0 to advance to the grand final against Manly-Warringah.

Melbourne began the 2012 NRL season with nine straight victories, before a Paul Gallen-less Sharks pipped them 12-10 thanks to a Jeremy Smith try and clutch conversion from Todd Carney. It looked like Cronulla would land two wins over Melbourne that year, leading 18–10 with 90 seconds to go in the second game between the sides.

Melbourne somehow scored twice to win 20–18. The competitive rivalry between the two sides officially began in late 2015 when Melbourne beat Cronulla 30–2 in spiteful circumstances. Cronulla coach Shane Flanagan accused Melbourne of slowing down the game with their wrestling tackle technique. The loss meant that Melbourne leapfrogged Cronulla into fourth place heading into the finals. Again, Cronulla-Sutherland handed Melbourne their first loss of the 2016 NRL season, winning the round 4 clash 14–6. It was the first match in Cronulla's record-breaking 15-match winning streak.

The two sides would meet in the final round of the regular season, with the winner taking out the minor premiership. Melbourne won 26-6 and took out the JJ Giltinan Shield. However, Cronulla-Sutherland would win the biggest game ever between the two sides 4 weeks later, winning the 2016 grand final by 14–12 in a thriller.

The two teams traded close wins in 2017, with Cronulla winning 11–2 at AAMI Park before Melbourne returned serve with an 18–13 victory at Southern Cross Group Stadium. 2018 saw Cronulla win both encounters with Melbourne during the regular season, yet despite this, lost to them in the preliminary final 22 to 6.

The match featured a controversial moment when Melbourne player Billy Slater made an illegal tackle on Cronulla winger Sosaia Feki while he was in the act of scoring, therefore constituting a professional foul. Slater managed to avoid the Sin Bin despite being penalised for the action, as well as avoiding suspension, with the NRL judiciary controversially ruling that the tackle did not constitute a shoulder charge. Their round 4 clash in 2018 saw a record 33 penalties blown, and Cameron Smith was sin-binned for the first time in his career.

In the 2021 NRL season, former Melbourne player Will Chambers signed a contract to join Cronulla-Sutherland, which closed the chapter of the two sides' competitive rivalry.Chambers had previously labelled Cronulla captain Paul Gallen and other Cronulla players as "Drug Cheats" during a 2017 game between the two sides.

=== Brisbane Broncos vs Melbourne Storm ===
Melbourne and Brisbane first played each other in a finals series game during Melbourne's first season in the competition in 1998. Brisbane won the match 30–6 at the Sydney Football Stadium.

These two sides then played each other in the finals from 2004 until 2009, with one of them being the 2006 NRL Grand Final. Five of those six finals were won by Melbourne; however, the most important meeting in the finals between the two sides was in 2006when Brisbane were able to get their sixth premiership with a scoreline of 15–8.

Melbourne got their revenge on the Broncos on three later occasions in the finals, firstly in the 2007 Qualifying Finals where they won 40–0, in 2009 they won 40–10 in the Preliminary Finals, in which they qualified for their fourth consecutive grand final appearance, but most notably their last-minute 16–14 win in Brisbane, which was hailed as the match of the 2008 NRL Season.

They met again in the Preliminary Finals in 2017, with Melbourne easily defeating Brisbane 30–0. In round 27 of the 2023 NRL season, the two sides met in the final round of the regular campaign. Brisbane and Melbourne both rested several players as each team had qualified for the finals. Melbourne would go on to win the game 32-22, which denied Brisbane their first Minor Premiership since the 2000 NRL season. The two sides would meet the following week in the 2023 qualifying final, with Brisbane defeating Melbourne 26–0 to book a place in the preliminary final. It was the first time Brisbane had beaten Melbourne at Suncorp Stadium since 2009 and the first time that they had defeated Melbourne in 14 attempts. Since the 2006 Grand Final, Melbourne have had the wood over Brisbane; Brisbane have only beaten them 5 times since then. The two sides would contest the 2025 NRL Grand Final, where Melbourne took a 22-12 half-time lead. In the second half, Brisbane would score 14 unanswered points to win their 7th premiership, defeating Melbourne 26–22.

=== Sydney Roosters vs Melbourne Storm ===
This competitive rivalry began in the 2017 NRL season when the two clubs met in round 16 at the Adelaide Oval. The Sydney Roosters won a very tight game in Golden Point 25-24, then only seven weeks later, Melbourne won the return game 16–13 at AAMI Park. In this game, the Sydney Roosters were leading 13–12 after 73 minutes after kicking a field goal before Joe Stimson scored a late try to seal the win just before full time. The competitive nature with the Sydney Roosters increased in the off-season when long-time player Cooper Cronk announced that he was moving to Sydney and joining the club for 2018.

In the 2018 premiership season, the two clubs only played one game, again at the Adelaide Oval. It was another tight game, which this time Melbourne won 9–8 with Cameron Smith kicking a late field goal to claim victory. The two clubs remained neck and neck at the top of the table with the Sydney Roosters pipping Melbourne for the minor premiership on points difference. The two clubs did not meet until the 2018 NRL Grand Final with the Sydney Roosters winning 21–6. In the game, Cooper Cronk, playing injured, assumed a virtual on-field player-coach role, using his years of Grand Final experience to help the Roosters defeat the Melbourne side.

In 2019, the teams played twice during the season, and both games were close. On Good Friday, the Sydney Roosters defeated Melbourne 21–20 in Golden Point overtime before the teams met once again in Adelaide, with Melbourne prevailing 14–12. The third clash of the year was the preliminary final, which the Sydney Roosters won 14–6 at the Sydney Cricket Ground.

With the 2020 NRL seasondisrupted by the COVID-19 pandemic, Melbourne's Round 8 "home" game against the Roosters was transferred to Suncorp Stadium in Brisbane. In a game that produced one of the more extraordinary finishes to an NRL game, the Sydney Roosters were leading 22–12 with 12 minutes left when Melbourne then scored two tries to take a 24–22 lead. The game was then tied up by a penalty goal to the Roosters before they also scored a 78th-minute field goal to lead 25–24. With seconds remaining, Melbourne's Ryan Papenhuyzen scored a field goal of his own to tie the scores up again at 25 all and send the game into Golden Point. Melbourne won the game with Cameron Smith kicking a penalty goal.

In round 24 of the 2022 NRL season, these two teams played out a thrilling yet very physical game, which saw the Sydney Roosters win 18–14. The Sydney Roosters had an early 14–0 lead but had to withstand a late Melbourne comeback to win the game, which included an amazing try saver that won the Roosters the game. This game didn't come without controversy though as there were multiple stoppages in play as the players went toe to toe with each other, including when Jared Waerea-Hargreaves and Nelson Asofa-Solomona had a fight which saw Hargreaves sent to the sin bin. The two sides would meet in the second week of the 2023 NRL finals series. Melbourne were heavy favourites going into the game, but with only minutes remaining, the Sydney Roosters were in front 13–12. This was until with three minutes remaining Melbourne scored a try through William Warbrick to win the match 18–13. The match wasn't without controversy due to Melbourne scoring a try in the first half, which came directly after Harry Grant had knocked the ball on from a cross-field kick. In the 2024 NRL season, the two clubs would meet each other in the preliminary final. On this occasion, Melbourne would comfortably beat the Sydney Roosters 48–18. In the 2025 NRL season, the Sydney Roosters inflicted one of the heaviest losses Melbourne has suffered at AAMI Park since it opened in 2010, defeating them 40–10.

== See also ==
- Derbies in the Rugby Football League
- Rivalries in the Australian Football League
