= Derbies in the Rugby Football League =

Local rivalry games in English rugby league

Whilst the sport of rugby league is played across Great Britain, it is most popular in its heartlands, the traditional counties of Yorkshire and Lancashire with the majority of professional and semi-professional clubs coming from this area of the country. Many fixtures are considered to be local derbies, where both teams come from the same town or city, or two that are very close to each other.

The 19th Earl of Derby stated in 2010 that the Derby name was originally only given to two sporting events: the Epsom horse race and fixtures between St Helens at one end of the family's Knowsley estate and Wigan at the other.

== Derbies ==
=== Battle of the Borough Derby ===
The "Battle of the Borough” refers to the rivalry between two teams from the Metropolitan Borough of Wigan - Leigh Leopards and the historically more dominant Wigan Warriors.

This rivalry has been absent for most of the Super League era with the two teams only competing in the same division on six occasions - 2005, 2017, 2021, 2023, 2024 and 2025.

=== Calder Derby ===
The Calder Derby is contested between Castleford Tigers and Wakefield Trinity, with both Wakefield and Castleford being part of the City of Wakefield metropolitan borough, which the River Calder flows through.

Historically Wakefield have been the more successful side, winning two league titles and five Challenge Cups. However, Castleford have been the more successful side in recent years winning five out the six games played in the 2014 and 2015 season by large margins. In terms of silverware, Castleford have also been the most successful in modern times winning three Challenge Cups since 1969 and appearing in five finals. Wakefield have only appeared in one final during this period. In 2006, Wakefield Trinity and Castleford met on the final day of the Super League season with the losing team facing relegation to National League One. Wakefield would go on to win the match 29-17 which relegated Castleford.

Both clubs also have a local rivalry with Featherstone Rovers, however this rivalry is not as strong due to competitive games between these sides nowadays being rare as Featherstone have played most of their recent seasons in the Championship. Before the Super League era, Featherstone derbies between Castleford, Featherstone and Wakefield were more closely and bitterly contested.

=== Cheshire Derby ===
The Cheshire Derby is a local derby between Warrington and Widnes. Both towns lie in the traditional county of Lancashire, but have been administered as part of Cheshire since 1974.

Both teams struck up a rivalry in the mid and late 20th century being local rivals and being somewhat dominant forces in the Challenge Cup, Widnes being known as the Cup Kings in the late 1970s and 1980s. Widnes were relegated in 2005, not returning to the Super League until 2011, whilst Warrington began to challenge the dominance of sides such as Leeds, Wigan and St Helens at the top.

=== Cumbrian Derby ===
The main derby in Cumbria is between Whitehaven and Workington Town, just a few miles apart from each other and connected by the A595 in the traditional county of Cumberland.

Both Whitehaven and Workington have a rivalry with Barrow Raiders in southwest Cumbria, in the traditional Furness area of Lancashire. The rivalry between Barrow and the other Cumbrian sides isn't as pronounced as travelling between Barrow and West Cumbria is difficult because of the terrain and the local roads.

=== East Lancashire Derby ===
The East Lancashire Derby takes place between Oldham Roughyeds and Rochdale Hornets, both teams are based in the east of the traditional county of Lancashire close to the Yorkshire border. The two teams contest The Law Cup as a pre-season friendly on an annual basis. This fixture was first played in 1921 and was contested for the 71st time in January 2025. The fixture is one of the oldest Derby matches in Rugby League.

=== French Derby ===
Despite not having played each other since both clubs' time in the Elite One Championship (2000 to 2006), the tie between Catalans Dragons and Toulouse Olympique was labelled the French Derby following Toulouse's promotion to the Super League in 2021.

=== Good Friday Rivalry ===
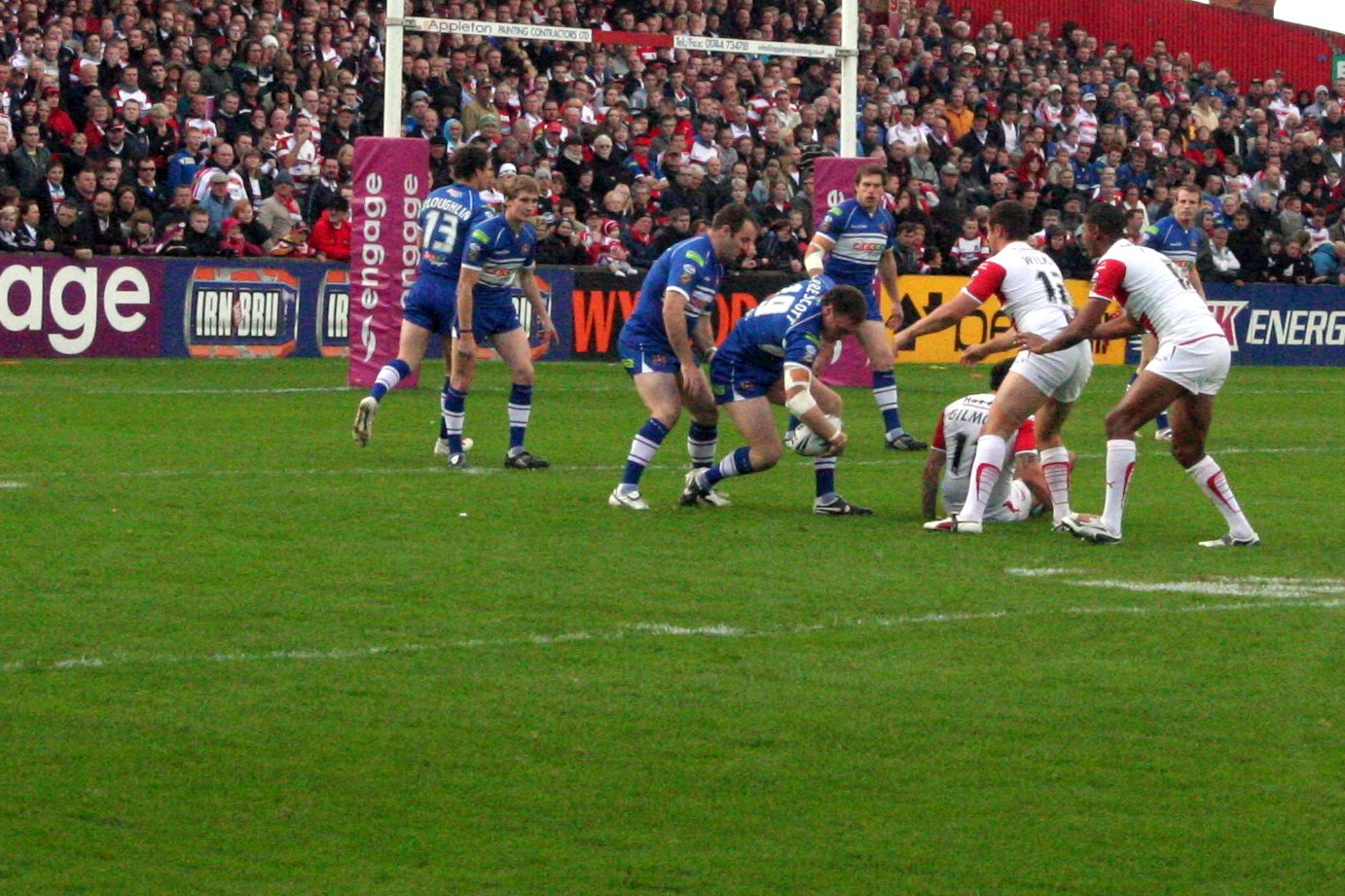
St Helens vs Wigan Warriors during the Super League XIV Semi-finals

The Good Friday Rivalry is contested between Wigan Warriors and St. Helens. Named as such as they traditionally meet on Good Friday (and also Boxing Day before Super League saw the sport switch to a summer schedule). The towns of St Helens and Wigan lie only eight miles apart in the traditional county of Lancashire. The two clubs have been the most successful clubs in England winning 31 Challenge Cups and 33 league titles between them. They have also met in three Grand Finals in the Super League era.

=== Heavy Woollen Derby ===
The Heavy Woollen Derby is a local derby contested between Batley Bulldogs and Dewsbury Rams. Both the towns of Batley and Dewsbury are in the Heavy Woollen district of Yorkshire, an area named after the heavy woollen cloth that was manufactured there in the 1800s.

=== Hull Derby ===
The Hull Derby is contested by Hull F.C. from the west side and Hull Kingston Rovers from the east side of the city of Kingston upon Hull. The two teams are separated by the River Hull. In the late 1990s a merger was proposed between the two clubs to form a team known as Humberside or simply Hull but this was later rejected. The rivalry was at its highest during the 1980s when both Hull sides were the dominant forces in the league. The Hull Derby is considered to be one of the most fierce derbies in Rugby League due to both of the clubs residing from within the same city.

=== Leeds Derby ===
The Leeds Derby is contested between Leeds and Hunslet. Leeds play in the north Leeds suburb of Headingley whilst Hunslet is a district in southern Leeds. For decades this derby match was fiercely contested, culminating in the 'All Leeds Final', the 1938 Championship decider between the two clubs at Elland Road which attracted an attendance of 54,112, still a record crowd for Rugby League in the city.

In more recent times the rivalry between the clubs has become more one-sided due to Leeds becoming one of the so-called 'big four' sides in the sport in recent times, whilst Hunslet last played in the top division in 1988. Therefore, the two teams rarely meet in competitive fixtures. Hunslet and Leeds also played derby games against a third team, Bramley, until they folded in 2000.

From 1912, Leeds and Hunslet F.C. played an annual pre-season friendly for the Lazenby Cup. The tradition was revived in the 2004 and was renamed in 2017 as the Harry Jepson OBE Memorial Cup.

=== Locker Cup Derby ===
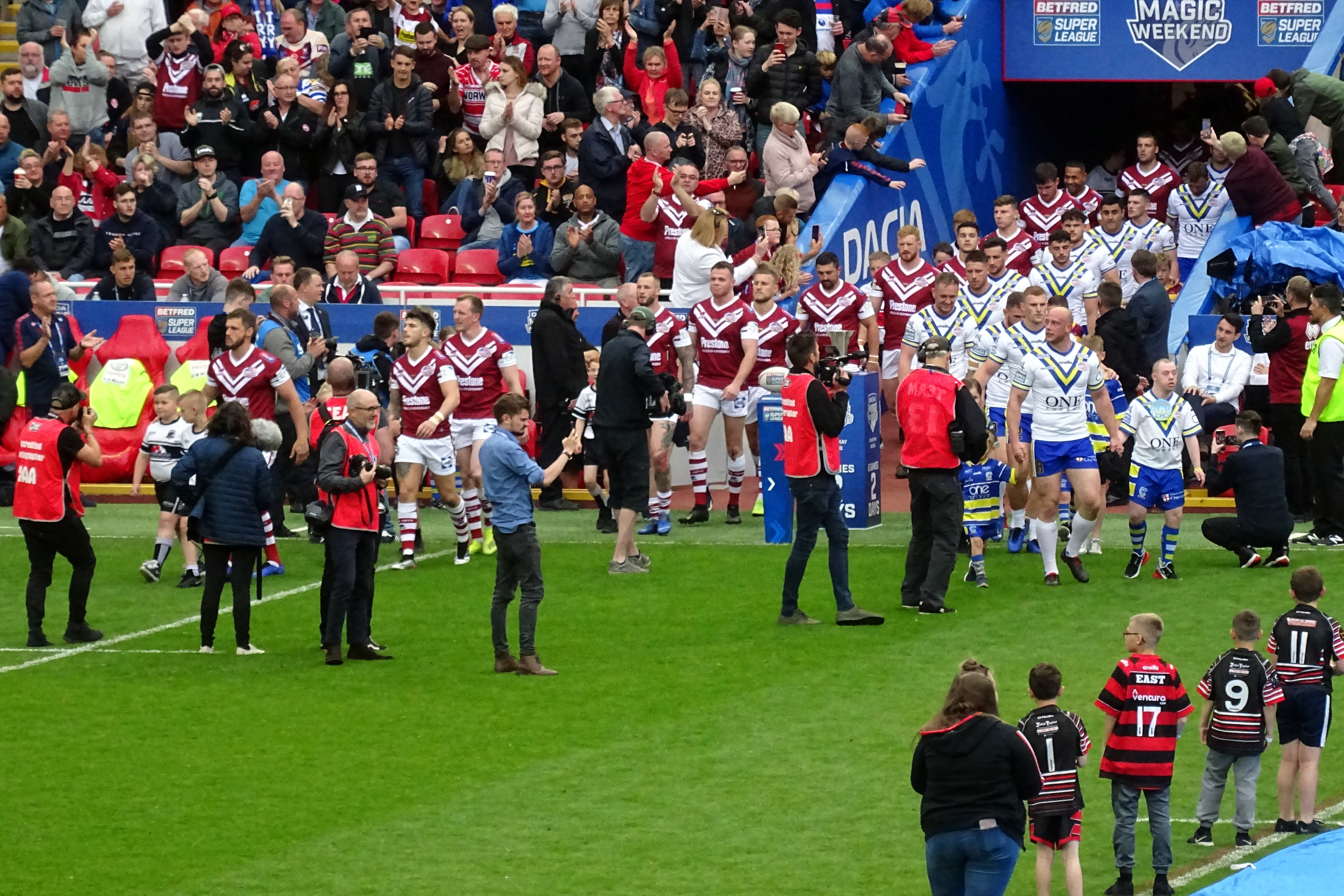
Warrington Wolves and Wigan Warriors enter Anfield for Magic Weekend 2019

The Locker Cup Derby is contested between Lancashire teams Warrington Wolves and Wigan Warriors. The teams are two of the most successful in England and their rivalry has greatly intensified since 2010 due to the rise in success of Warrington Wolves. The rivalry has varied in intensity throughout history with both clubs having stronger rivalries with Widnes Vikings and St Helens respectively.

=== London Derby ===
The London Derby is contested between London Broncos and London Skolars; these teams being the only professional or semi-professional sides within Greater London. As yet, there isn't much of a rivalry as neither team had met in the same division until recent times, and the Broncos have played at many different grounds around London, therefore making it difficult to build a stable fan base. However they play each other in a pre-season friendly called the Capital Challenge which is held at the Artillery Grounds.

=== Roses Derbies ===
Games between Yorkshire clubs Halifax and Huddersfield Giants against traditional Lancashire clubs Oldham and Rochdale Hornets are often called Roses Derbies or Wars of the Roses due to the clubs being located near the edge of the county boundaries. Meetings between Oldham and Huddersfield were particularly competitive up until the mid 1990s.

=== Salford Derby ===
An East Lancashire rivalry has previously existed with in the City of Salford between Salford City Reds and Swinton Lions, this fixture is also known as the Salford Derby, despite Swinton now being based in Sale.

=== South Yorkshire Derby ===
The South Yorkshire Derby is contested between Sheffield Eagles and Doncaster. The only competitive matches between the two have occurred in the Championship. Sheffield are the more successful team, winning back-to-back Championship titles in 2012 and 2013, and the Challenge Cup in 1998.

=== War of the Roses Derby ===
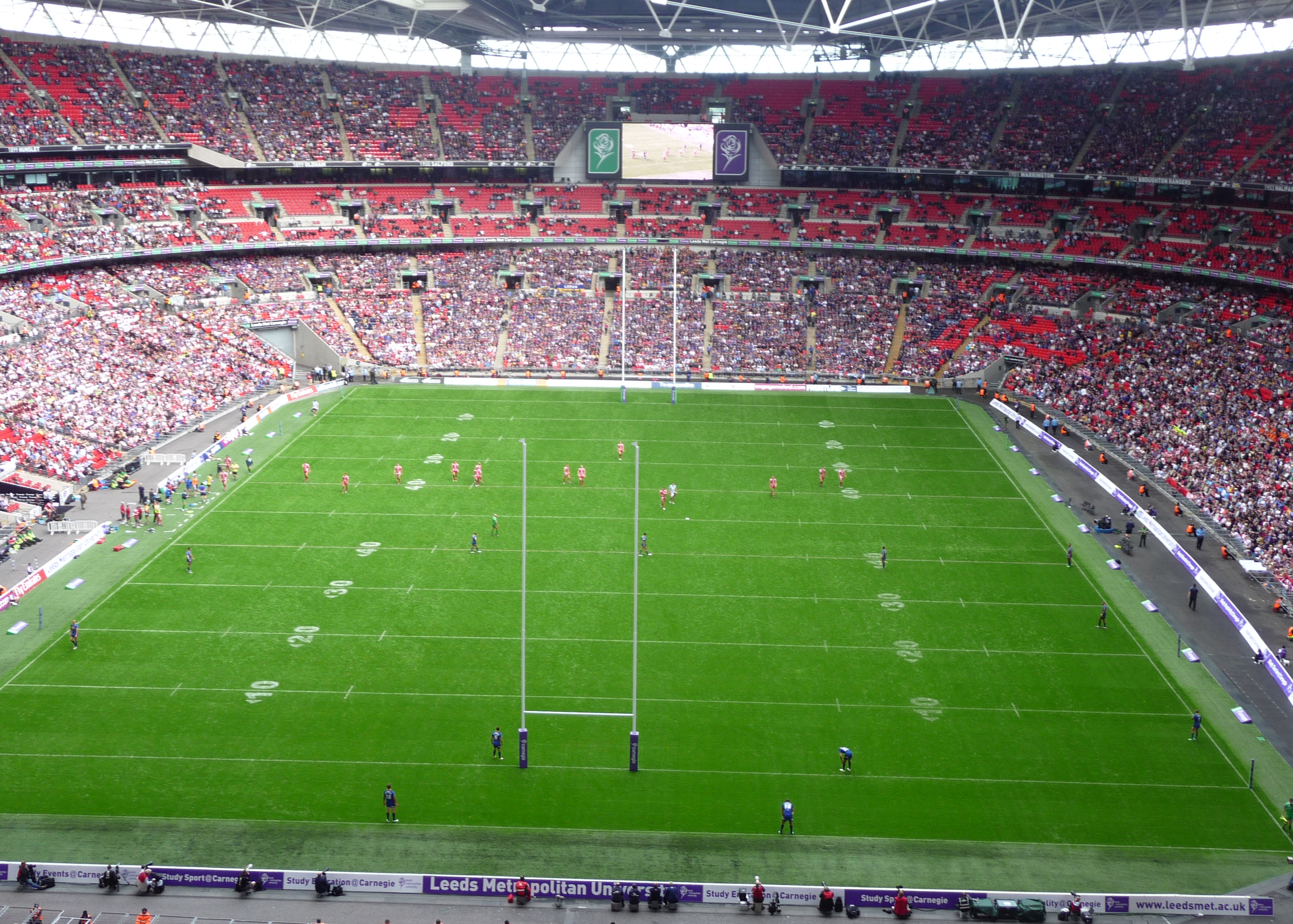
Leeds Rhinos and Wigan Warriors contest the 2011 Challenge Cup Final

The term War of the Roses is used to describe the rivalry between Lancashire giant Wigan Warriors and Yorkshire giant Leeds Rhinos. The two sides generated a rivalry out of being two of the best sides in the country. The term started use after the War of the Roses county of origin series was discontinued.

=== Welsh Derby ===
The Big Welsh Derby is played between the only two Welsh clubs in the professional ranks of British rugby league.

Celtic Crusaders joined the national leagues in 2006 and were, at that time, the only Welsh side outside the amateur game. They left South Wales and moved to Wrexham in 2009. This led to Wales' second club South Wales Scorpions being formed. In 2011, Celtic Crusaders folded and the new club North Wales Crusaders were entered into League 1 in 2012.

=== West Yorkshire Derby ===
The rivalry between the Leeds Rhinos and the Bradford Bulls is one of the great rivalries in English Rugby League and is the most common fixture termed the West Yorkshire Derby, occasionally the 'Airport Derby'. The cities are next to one another and the teams have met in countless cup finals. During the early years of the Super League the rivalry peaked, with both Leeds and Bradford being dominant forces in Rugby League, challenging for numerous titles whilst meeting in Grand Finals and Challenge Cups. Bradford fell into financial trouble in 2011 and 2012, had not won or appeared in a final since 2005 and had to sell players to keep the club alive. The rivalry remains passionate despite Bradford's decline and Leeds continuing to win many more titles. Bradford were relegated in 2014, the first time in 40 years, ending competitive league fixtures between the sides. The most recent competitive meeting between the two sides was a Challenge Cup sixth round tie in May 2019, which Bradford won 24-22 to progress to the quarter finals.

Other West Yorkshire derbies

Many other derbies take place in West Yorkshire with specific names such as the Calder derby and the Heavy Woollen Derby. The Festive Challenge is an annual Boxing Day friendly between rivals Leeds Rhinos and Wakefield Trinity. The Castleford verses Leeds rivalry has become a more prominent derby in recent times.

== Super League Big Four ==
In addition to traditional local derbies, a four-way rivalry exist between the so-called Super League Big Four, reflecting the success of recent teams in certain years. These four team are usually contain the champion of every season, both in the Super League (Grand Final and League Leaders) and Challenge Cup.

The Big Four consists of Wigan Warriors, St Helens, Leeds Rhinos, and Warrington Wolves. Prior to 2010, Bradford Bulls was considered a Big Four member, before the rise of Warrington, the club has since dropped in performance level and now plays in the Championship.

=== Results of the Big Four ===
Key

- Number denotes league position

Grand Final Champions Grand Final Runners-up

Results of the 'Big Four' during 1996–2009
Season	Bradford Bulls	Leeds Rhinos	St. Helens	Wigan Warriors
1996	3	10	1	2
1997	1	5	3	4
1998	5	2	4	1
1999	1	3	2	4
2000	3	4	2	1
2001	1	5	4	2
2002	2	4	1	3
2003	1	2	4	3
2004	2	1	5	4
2005	3	2	1	7
2006	4	3	1	8
2007	3	2	1	6
2008	5	2	1	4
2009	9	1	2	6
Titles	4	4	5	1

Results of the 'Big Four' since 2010
Season	Leeds Rhinos	St. Helens	Wigan Warriors	Warrington Wolves
2010	4	2	1	3
2011	5	3	2	1
2012	5	3	1	2
2013	3	5	4	2
2014	6	1	2	5
2015	1	2	3	6
2016	9	4	3	2
2017	2	4	6	9
2018	10	1	2	4
2019	8	1	2	4
2020	5	2	1	3
2021	5	2	4	3
Titles	4	4	4	0

== See also ==
- List of sports rivalries in the United Kingdom
- Rivalries in the National Rugby League
