= 2011 Wigan Warriors season =

- 2011 Challenge Cup champions
- Super League XVI Rank: 2nd
- Play-off result: Semi-finals
- Challenge Cup: Winners; 28–18 (vs Leeds Rhinos)
- World Club Challenge: Lost final; 15–21 (vs St George Illawarra Dragons)
- 2011 record: Wins: 21; draws: 3; losses: 4
- Points scored: For: 803; against: 404

Team information
- Chairman: Ian Lenagan
- Head coach: Michael Maguire
- Captain: Sean O'Loughlin
- Stadium: DW Stadium
- Avg. attendance: 16,189
- Agg. attendance: 194,265 over twelve games
- High attendance: 24,268; 27 February (vs St George Illawarra Dragons)
← 2010	List of seasons	2012 →

The 2011 Wigan Warriors season is the club's 16th season in the Super League, since its launch in 1996.

Michael Maguire carried on as head coach in what would be his last season, and Ian Lenagan continued as the club's chairman and owner. Wigan reverted to using a solo captain in Sean O'Loughlin, having used a "leadership team" during the previous season. The club played at the town's DW Stadium for its 12th consecutive full season.

Wigan entered the season as defending champions, having won the 2010 Super League Grand Final against rivals St Helens R.F.C., and were pre-season favourites to do "The Double" in defending their championship and winning the Challenge Cup. They also had an opportunity as Super League XV winners to contest the 2011 World Club Challenge at the DW Stadium on 27 February, but lost to St George Illawarra Dragons. Their regular season opened against St Helens RLFC on 12 February with a 16–16 draw. Their Challenge Cup campaign started in the fourth round on 8 May with a 52–0 whitewash over the Barrow Raiders. This was then followed up by a 28–22 win over fellow Super League side Bradford Bulls, noted for the late challenge by Bradford's Gareth Raynor, on Sam Tomkins that knocked the Wigan man out cold as he scored Wigan's second try and wins over Warrington Wolves and St Helens R.F.C. to set up a Wembley Stadium showdown with Leeds Rhinos on 27 August 2011. In the final itself, Wigan would run out 28–18 victors to record their 18th success in the competition and lift the trophy for the first time at the new Wembley Stadium.

== Background ==
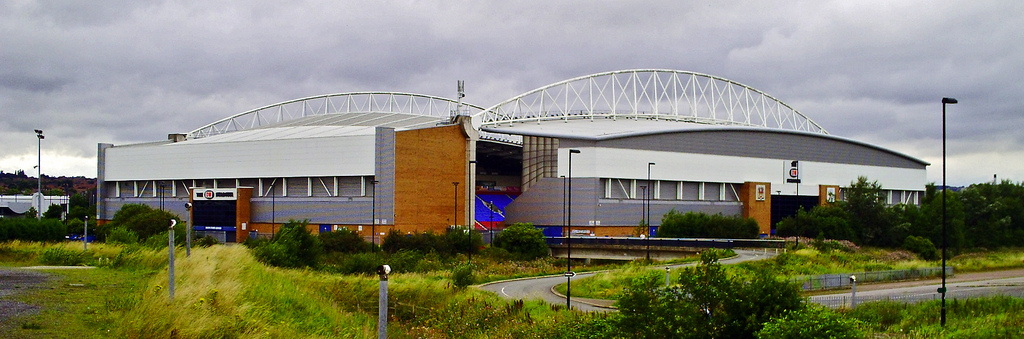
The DW Stadium, Wigan Warriors home ground

Ian Lenagan continued on as chairman of the club which achieved a 'B' license under the Rugby Football League's franchise system in 2008. Although Wigan's 2010 Challenge Cup campaign ended in the quarter-finals following a loss to the Leeds Rhinos, the Super League campaign ended with a 22–10 victory over St Helens R.F.C. in the Grand Final at Old Trafford, having already won the League Leader's Shield for finishing on top the Super League table at the close of the regular season. This was the club's second Super League title, their first since Super League III in 1998. By virtue of becoming Super League premiers, the club was automatically entered into the 2011 World Club Challenge to play the Australasian 2010 National Rugby League premiers, the St. George Illawarra Dragons. Michael Maguire entered his second year as head coach, despite speculation he would return to his native Australia, following his debut year in which he brought the club's first major honour since Stuart Raper guided Wigan to success in the 2002 Challenge Cup final. Having used a "leadership team" consisting of Sean O'Loughlin, George Carmont, Thomas Leuluai, Andy Coley, Phil Bailey and Joel Tomkins, the team opted to have O'Loughlin as their sole captain.

The 2011 season was the club's sixteenth in the Super League as an ever-present side in the competition. It was also the twelfth full season playing at the DW Stadium, which the club had shared with football side Wigan Athletic F.C. since 1999. The salary cap that all Super League XVI teams had to abide by remained unchanged from the previous year at GBP£1.65 million, although a slight change was made for the 2011 season to provide more space for a club's own-trained players.

== Pre-season ==
Following the completion of the domestic 2010 seasons in both the Super League and the National Rugby League, the international season began with the 2010 Four Nations, this year held in Australia and New Zealand. Thomas Leuluai was the only British-based player to be named in the New Zealand Kiwis squad for the tournament—Greg Eastwood played for Leeds Rhinos during 2010 and was also announced in the squad, but returned to Canterbury Bulldogs at the end of the season. Sam Tomkins, who was named Rookie of the Year at the Rugby League International Federation awards, was named in the England team along with Darrell Goulding, Sean O'Loughlin and Stuart Fielden. Leuluai featured in a pre-Four Nations test match against Samoa, while Tomkins was influential in England's 18–18 warm-up match against New Zealand Māori, helping to set up a Ryan Atkins try and scoring one of his own. However, no Wigan player managed to score for England in the whole tournament as the national team only managed one win against the minnows, Papua New Guinea. In contrast, Leuluai played in a Kiwis side which made the final, and stole victory from Australia with a Nathan Fien try in the 79th minute at the Suncorp Stadium in Brisbane.

At the start of the pre-season, Wigan immediately lost two players in Josh Veivers and Stuart Howarth from the club's academy, both of whom signed for Wakefield Trinity Wildcats. It was also confirmed that Cameron Phelps would not be offered an extension to his contract, which expired at the end of the 2010 season. However, George Carmont and Karl Pryce were both given a one-year contract for the 2011 season. Michael Maguire refuted speculation that Josh Charnley was to join Harlequins RL on a season-long loan, while Chris Tuson also agreed a contract extension which would keep him at Wigan until the end of the 2012 season with an additional year optional. Academy player Matthew Sarsfield signed a three-year contract with Huddersfield Giants. Pryce and Joe Mellor were confirmed in a one-year loan deal to Harlequins, while both Sam and Joel Tomkins along with Charnley and Liam Farrell were given five-year contract extensions, with Goudling and Harrison Hansen being offered three-year extensions. This completed Wigan's transfer activity during the pre-season, in addition to the signings of Brett Finch, Ryan Hoffman and Jeff Lima made midway through the 2010 season.

Three pre-season friendlies were played as a warm-up to the 2011 campaign. Firstly Wigan faced Salford City Reds at The Willows, where a team largely consistent with the 2010 Grand Final winning side, plus the additions of new arrivals Hoffman and Lima, was ultimately too much for Salford to hold back, with the Reds' head coach Shaun McRae describing Wigan as "the team to beat" for the 2011 season. A young Wigan side then defeated the Barrow Raiders 24–32 at Craven Park in a testimonial match. In a second testimonial, this time for Jon Clarke, the Warriors won their final pre-season friendly against Warrington Wolves.

LEGEND
Win
Draw
Loss

Opponent	Score	H/A	Date
Salford City Reds	24–30	Away	16 January 2011
Barrow Raiders	24–32	Away	23 January 2011
Warrington Wolves	18–24	Away	2 February 2011

== Regular season ==
=== February ===
Wigan's regular season started with a 16–all draw against derby rivals St Helens R.F.C. in front of a 30,891 crowd at the Millennium Stadium—a match in which three Wigan scores, including a debut try for Ryan Hoffman, were cancelled out by three Saints tries late in the second half. Jeff Lima, who also made his debut during the first round robin game of the season, received a two match ban for alleged chicken wing tackles, meaning he missed the World Club Challenge later in the month. However, a 0–26 half-time lead proved too much for Bradford Bulls as the Warriors won their next game comfortably, although Martin Gleeson picked up a hamstring injury. For the World Club Challenge, which was the first match of the 2011 season played at Wigan's DW Stadium, Stuart Fielden had to be withdrawn from the squad on match day due to injury. Gleeson was deemed fit enough to play and therefore started, but had to be withdrawn early against St George Illawarra Dragons because of his hamstring injury, a game which Wigan lost thanks to a Jamie Soward try despite the home side leading by one point at half-time.

In the week preceding the World Club Challenge, the Manchester Evening News alleged that during the pre-season, Gleeson had been the target of blackmail which had included death threats, and that on 13 December 2010 he had contacted the police about the matter. According to the newspaper, three men were arrested in relation to the claims, but Gleeson refused to assist the police further with their investigations and the case collapsed.

=== March ===
In their round four match, in which Lima made his return from suspension, a spirited Salford City Reds effort in the first half kept the visiting Wigan side to a six-point lead at half-time, but three-second half tries allowed the Warriors to pull away and put the World Club Challenge defeat behind them. The team maintained their unbeaten start to the league campaign with a late fightback against Hull FC, despite Joel Tomkins being sent off and a last minute penalty to Hull which would have tied the game had it been scored, but Danny Tickle missed with his attempt. The Tomkins brothers, Joel and Sam, both received match bans, two and one respectively, a decision which was upheld by the RFL following an appeal on Joel's ban. Nevertheless, Wigan defeated Huddersfield Giants with a comfortable 6–20 win despite also missing Paul Deacon, Pat Richards and Fielden in addition to the Tomkins. Pre-season signing Brett Finch made a try-scoring debut for the club, and Sam Tomkins returned from suspension to take on Warrington Wolves at the DW Stadium, but the last unbeaten start of Super League XVI fell as Wigan were easily beaten 6–24 by the visiting side.

Gleeson's omission from the squad that faced Salford, despite being injured in the previous match against St George Illawarra, fuelled speculation about his future at the club, rumours which both Michael Maguire and Ian Lenagan remained silent on. The BBC also raised doubts on the future of Richards at the club, after they reported that rugby union side Sale Sharks were interested in signing the 2010 Super League Man of Steel. The BBC also reported that Wigan were hopeful on Gareth Hock, who was banned by anti-doping authorities in 2009 for cocaine use, being allowed to train with the club two months prior to the ban's expiration date in June.

=== April ===
A game against Leeds Rhinos in round eight that seemed beyond Wigan's reach at 22–4 behind with Lima sin-binned ended in the Warriors' second draw of the season thanks to three tries late the second half, and an injury-time penalty kicked by Sam Tomkins. Lima was charged and banned for one game for the incident which had him sin-binned. Richards returned for his first appearance since being injured in the 2010 Grand Final, but the club's winless streak stretched to three after being defeated by Catalans Dragons at home. Darrell Goulding was dropped for the team's next game against Hull Kingston Rovers, however the team welcomed back Deacon, Lima and Liam Farrell from injuries and suspensions. Willie Mason scored his first Super League try, but Wigan defeated Hull Kingston Rovers 16–32 at Craven Park, and followed this with another win as a last minute Farrell try stole a victory for Wigan against St Helens in the traditional Good Friday derby. Their second Easter weekend fixture was a whitewash as an unchanged Warriors side beat the Wakefield Trinity Wildcats for a third win in a row.

Following the Leeds game, Gleeson's time at his hometown club came to an end, with the club citing various reasons for the former Great Britain international's departure. A day later, the Rugby Football League cleared Hock to start training with the Warriors again. In the wake of the Catalans loss, speculation in Australia over head coach Maguire's future at the club intensified after Wayne Bennett chose to be the new head coach of Newcastle Knights, leaving an open vacancy at South Sydney Rabbitohs. After the match against Hull Kingston Rovers, Lenagan made an official statement on behalf of the club revealing that Maguire had accepted an offer from South Sydney Rabbitohs, and would be leaving Wigan at the end of the 2011 season, with assistant coach Shaun Wane favourite to replace him.

=== May ===
Wigan continued their winning streak at the Racecourse Ground in Wrexham over Crusaders RL, a result which took them to the top of the league table, tied on points with Warrington and Huddersfield. The team's first Challenge Cup fixture against Barrow Raiders was their next match, and with Jack Hughes making his first-team debut, the Warriors whitewashed their opponents to advance into a fifth round meeting against Bradford later in the month. Returning to Super League action, Thomas Leuluai, Sam Tomkins and Richards all scored braces on the way to a 52–6 win over Harlequins RL. An ill-tempered fifth round Cup game at Bradford's Odsal Stadium was exemplified with Gareth Raynor's sending off in the first half for foul play as Sam Tomkins was scoring a try, however a Richards brace helped Wigan survive a late comeback to go through to the next round—a quarterfinal draw against Cup holders Warrington. Sam Tomkins and Richards both scored hat-tricks against Hull Kingston Rovers as Wigan completed a perfect May record in their final match of the month.

Richards, who scored nine tries and thirty-three goals during May, signed a two-year extension to his contract, rejecting a return to the NRL and a potential cross-code transfer to rugby union club Sale Sharks. Hock, whose two-year suspension for drug use was due to end on 23 June, signed a five-year contract with the club to the end of the 2015 season.

=== June ===
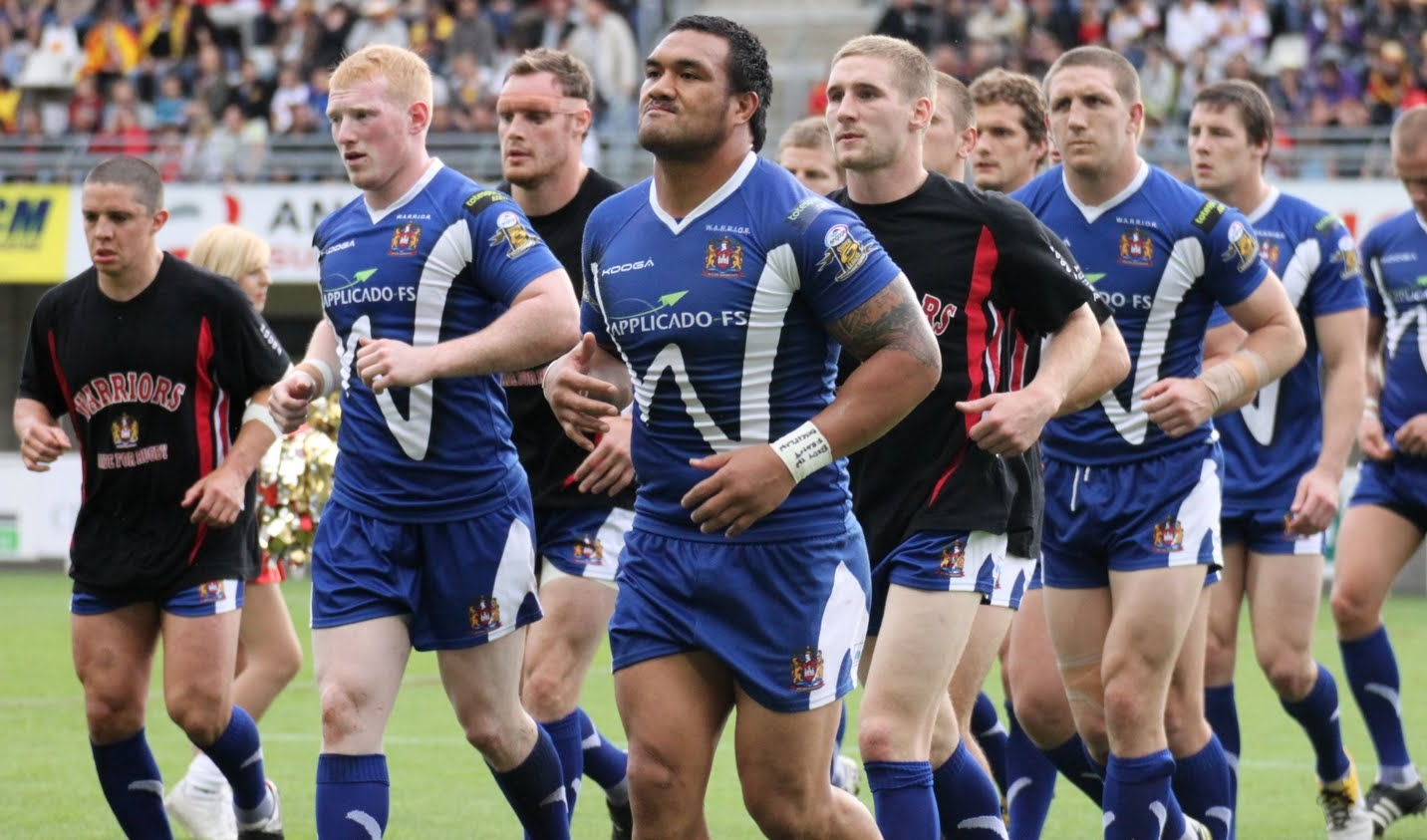
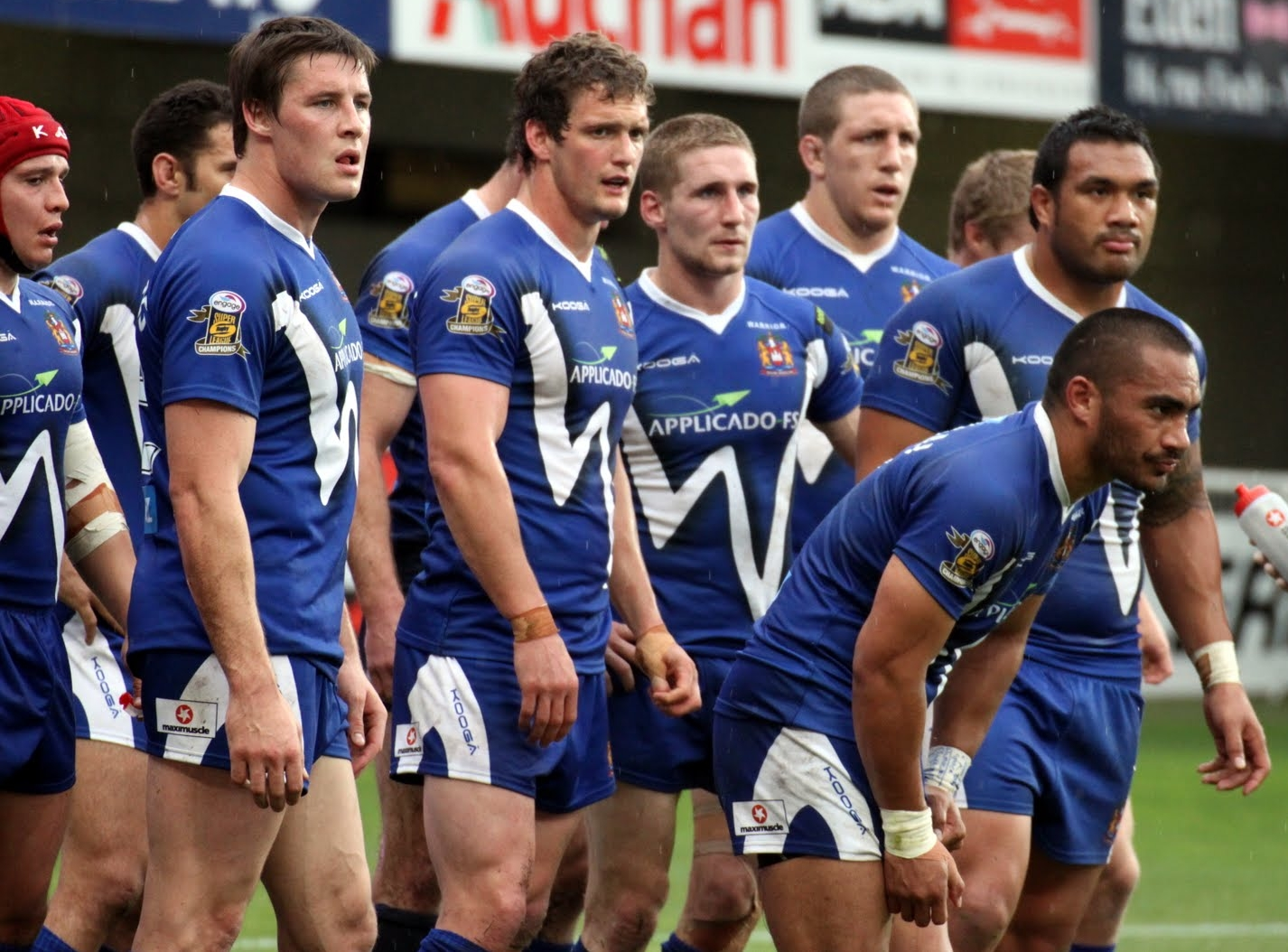
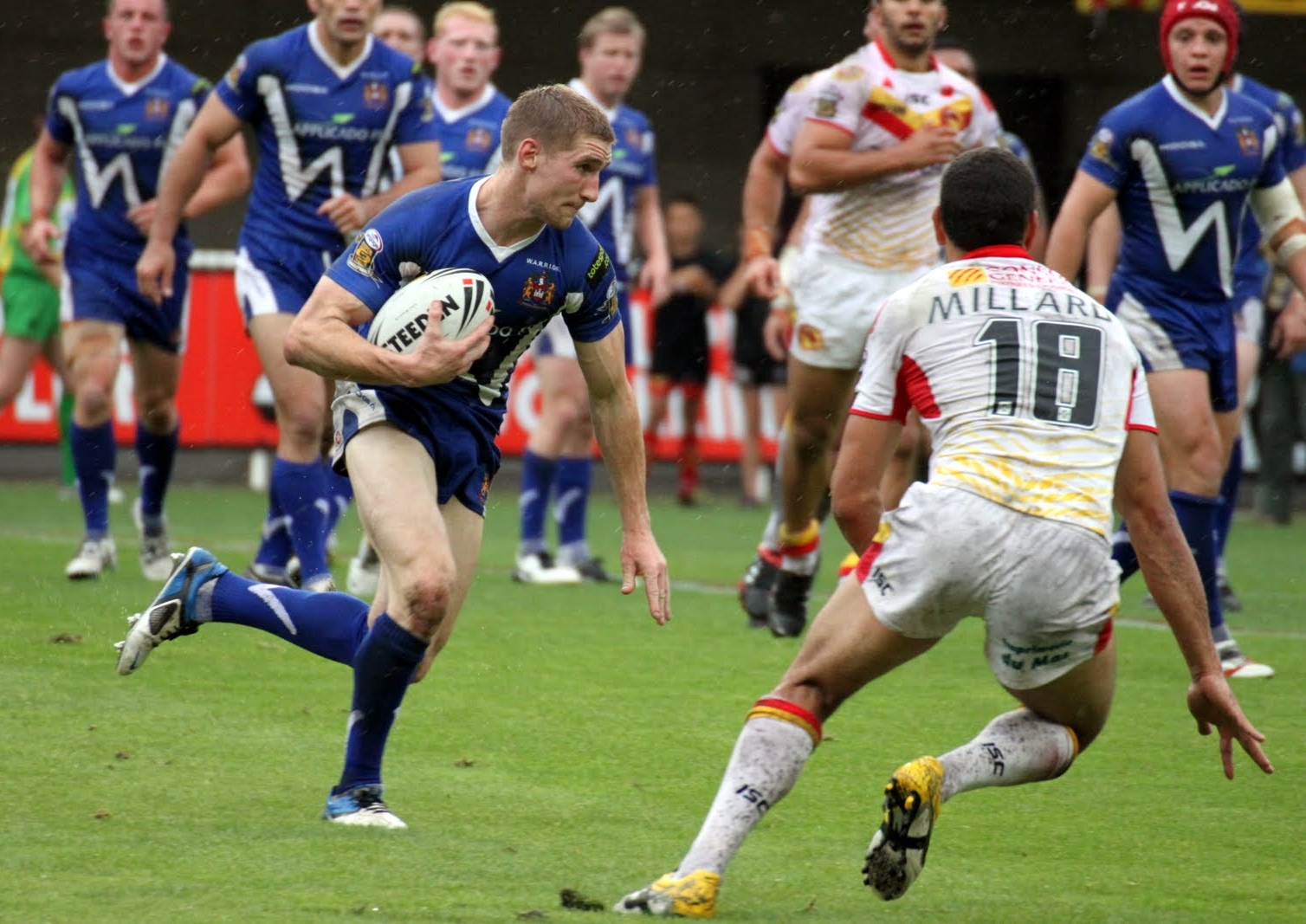
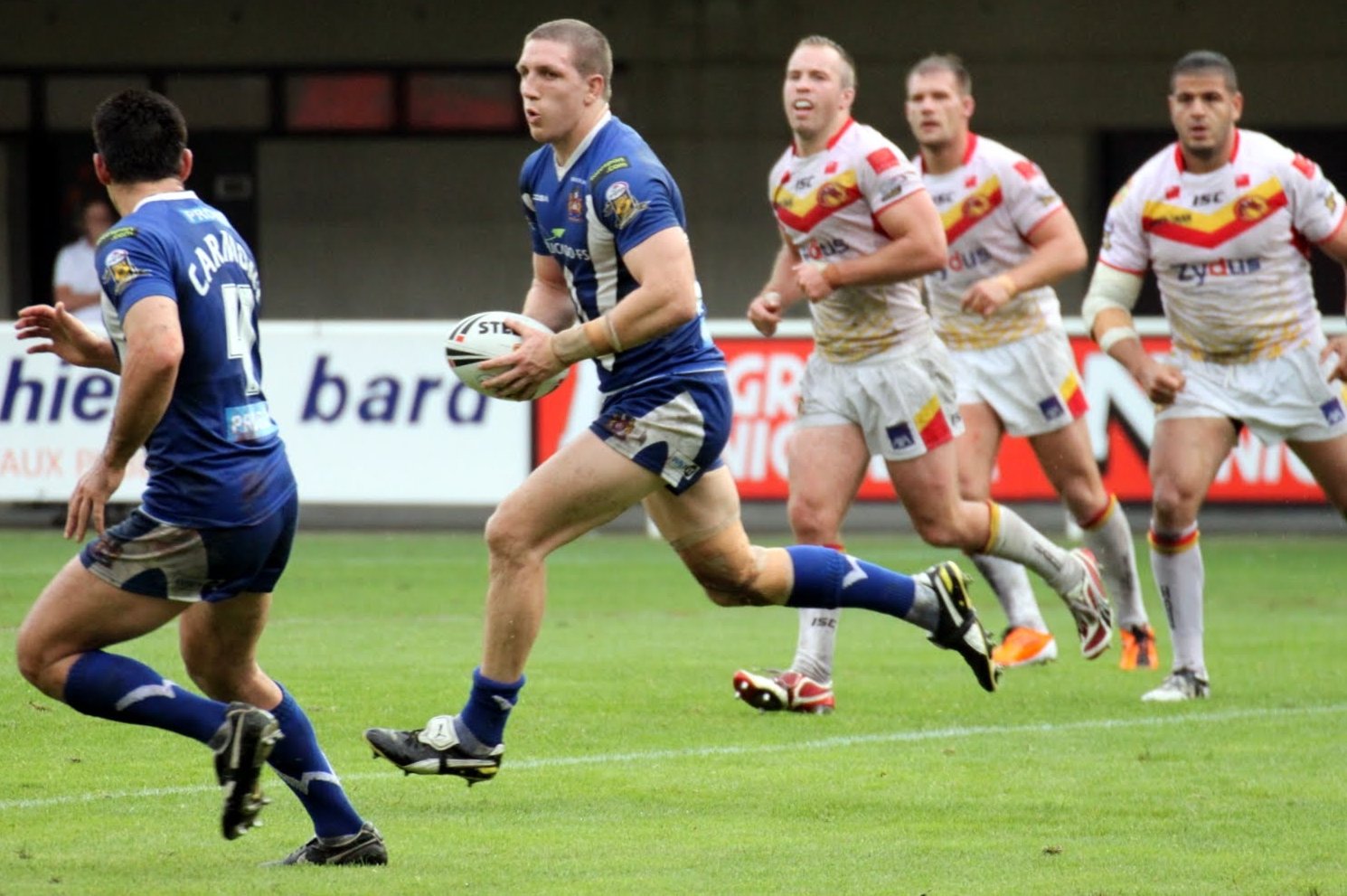
Wigan against Catalans Dragons in the Super League XVI

Wigan's eight-match winning spree was toppled in the first rugby league match ever to be played at the Stade Yves-du-Manoir in Montpellier, after Daryl Millard's second try of the night handed Catalans Dragons a 20–12 victory. The seventeenth round fixture against Castleford Tigers came just two days after the inaugural International Origin Match which featured George Carmont, Leuluai and Richards playing for the Exiles, and Sean O'Loughlin, Michael McIlorum and both Tomkins brothers representing England. Consequently, Origin match-winner Carmont and Sam Tomkins were both rested against Castleford, a match which Wigan looked to be comfortably winning with a 4–22 lead before a second half performance which Maguire described as "unacceptable" allowed the Tigers to come back, with Kirk Dixon missing a late-minute conversion meaning the match ended in Wigan's third draw of the season. The Warriors returned to winning ways against St Helens in the final derby game of the regular season with a 10–32 win at the Saints' temporary Stobart Stadium base, a result which took Wigan to the top of the Super League table before Huddersfield reclaimed the position the day after. Wigan then leapfrogged Huddersfield into second place in the table after defeating them in a comprehensive 46–12 win, with Sam Tomkins scoring another hat-trick and Hock making his first appearance for the club in two years following the completion of his drugs ban received in 2009.

In the week following the Catalans match, Leuluai rubbished rumours that he intended to follow Maguire to the South Sydney Rabbitohs at the end of the year. Wane, Wigan's assistant coach and a former player, was formally backed by Maguire to succeed him as head coach for the 2012 season following the latter's return to Australia.

=== July ===
A late Danny McGuire would-be try with five minutes remaining looked to have snatched a victory for Leeds, before the video referee ruled McGuire had knocked-on in the process, allowing Wigan to close out a tough 26–24 home win. Charnley scored a brace to help Wigan reach the top of the table after winning their next match 26–16 against a Castleford side missing eleven first-team players through injury, with their head coach Terry Matterson believing that "the welfare of the players was compromised" by playing the rearranged round 3 match mid-week in early July. Six separate players scored tries against Harlequins, including a Deacon brace, as Wigan made it three wins in nine days. Hock earned his first tries after returning from his ban with a hat-trick against Wakefield, and Sam Tomkins also scored two tries, as Wigan won their sixth match in a row, although Chris Tuson was injured with a damaged medial ligament and was ruled out of action for six weeks.

Castleford responded to their loss against the Warriors and the injuries of Nick Fozzard and Jacob Emmitt during the match by signing Wigan's Ben Davies on a one-month loan. On 12 July, Ben Cross was signed by the club with immediate effect until the end of the season, when it was intended that he would transfer to Widnes Vikings for their return to Super League in 2012. On the same day, Carmont postponed his retirement from rugby league to carry on playing at Wigan, after signing a one-year contract for the 2012 season. However, Hoffman confirmed that when his twelve-month contract expired at the end of 2011, he would leave the club and return to the Melbourne Storm, whom he left to join Wigan following their salary cap scandal in 2010.

=== August ===
August would bring 4 wins from 4 matches for the Warriors, extending their run to 12 consecutive wins. The month was bookended by triumphs in the Challenge Cup, with a hard-fought 18–12 win against St Helens in the semi-final and a 28–18 victory against Leeds Rhinos in the final at Wembley. In between, there were routine wins against Salford City Reds (52–18) and Bradford Bulls (60–12).

In the semi-final, Wigan survived an early onslaught by St Helens who couldn't convert early opportunities. Both sides had kicks at goal in the opening 20 minutes with Jamie Foster converting his to make the score 2–0 to Saints after 30 minutes. On 33 minutes a break from Josh Charnley down Wigan's right flank was stopped by Saints' Paul Wellens only for the Warriors to switch the ball to the other side on the next tackle for George Carmont to touch down. The game was still in the balance as both teams went in at 6–2 at the break. Wigan showed why they are the Champions after the break with two tries in the space of five minutes around the hour mark. The tie looked beyond doubt, however Saints fought back with two tries from Jamie Foster to make for a nervy finish. However, Wigan held out to book their place at Wembley at the end of the month.

In Wigan's next game was at home to Salford City Reds. The shine was taken off the win as it was found that Ben Cross (who had only joined Wigan the previous month) had suffered a broken arm that would not only rule him out for the Challenge Cup final but also for the rest of the season, bringing his brief Wigan career to an end.

Against Bradford, the Warriors were ruthless, running in 12 tries. Only the errant kicking boots of Pat Richards prevented the scoreline from being any higher. The 60–12 win proved the perfect preparation for the Warriors heading into the Challenge Cup final against Leeds Rhinos.

== Transfers ==
=== Transfers in ===
Pos	Name	From	Date	Notes
Scrum half	Brett Finch	Melbourne Storm	19 July 2010
Prop	Jeff Lima	Melbourne Storm	19 July 2010
second row	Ryan Hoffman	Melbourne Storm	19 July 2010
second row	Gareth Hock	(Suspension)	11 May 2011
Prop	Ben Cross	(Released) (Note: Cross signed for Leeds Rhinos for the 2011 season, and was released in June before signing for Wigan in July.)	12 July 2011

=== Transfers out ===
Pos	Name	To	Date	Notes
Full Back	Cameron Phelps	(Released) (Note: Phelps eventually signed a one-year contract with Hull F.C. two days before the Super League XVI season started.)	October 2010
Hooker	Mark Riddell	Sydney Roosters	30 June 2010
second row	Phil Bailey	Salford City Reds (Note: Bailey was signed by Salford City Reds, but was forced to retire from rugby league altogether before making his debut appearance.)	1 September 2010
Prop	Iafeta Paleaaesina	Salford City Reds	1 September 2010
Winger	Shaun Ainscough	Bradford Bulls	30 August 2010
Centre	Martin Gleeson	(Released) (Note: Gleeson signed for Hull on 14 April 2011.)	4 April 2011

== Players ==
=== 2011 squad ===
2011 Wigan Warriors season
First team squad			Coaching staff
1 Sam Tomkins – FB, SO; 2 Darrell Goulding – WG, CE; 3 Martin Gleeson – CE; 4 George Carmont – CE; 5 Pat Richards – WG, FB; 6 Paul Deacon – SO, SH; 7 Thomas Leuluai – SH, HK; 8 Stuart Fielden – PR; 9 Michael McIlorum – HK; 10 Andy Coley – PR; 11 Harrison Hansen – SR; 12 Joel Tomkins – SR, LF; 13 Sean O'Loughlin (c) – LF, SO	14 Paul Prescott – PR; 15 Jeff Lima – PR; 16 Ryan Hoffman – SR; 17 Brett Finch – SO, SH; 19 Amos Roberts – WG, FB; 20 Eamon O'Carroll – PR; 21 Lee Mossop – SR, PR; 22 Liam Farrell – SR, LF; 23 Chris Tuson – SR; 24 Stefan Marsh – CE; 25 Josh Charnley – WG, CE; 26 Karl Pryce – WG, CE; 27 Ben Davies – PR	28 Jonny Walker – SR; 29 Dominic Crosby – PR; 30 Logan Tomkins – HK; 31 Joe Mellor – CE; 32 Ryan King – WG; 33 Jack Hughes – PR; 34 Gareth Hock – SR, PR	Head coach: Michael Maguire; Assistant coach: Shaun Wane; Legend: (c) Captain(s); (vc) Vice-captain(s); Updated: 21 February 2011; Source(s):

== Fixtures ==
LEGEND
Win
Draw
Loss

=== World Club Challenge ===
Round	Opponent	Score	H/A	Attendance	Date
Final	St George Illawarra Dragons	15–21	Home	24,268	27 February 2011

=== Super League ===
Round	Opponent	Score	H/A	Attendance	Date
1	St Helens R.F.C.	16–16	Neutral	30,891	12 February 2011
2	Bradford Bulls	10–44	Away	15,348	20 February 2011
4	Salford City Reds	16–32	Away	6,266	4 March 2011
5	Hull F.C.	14–12	Home	15,346	13 March 2011
6	Huddersfield Giants	6–20	Away	8,151	18 March 2011
7	Warrington Wolves	6–24	Home	20,056	25 March 2011
8	Leeds Rhinos	22–22	Away	16,118	1 April 2011
9	Catalans Dragons	28–47	Home	13,134	8 April 2011
10	Hull Kingston Rovers	16–28	Away	8,703	15 April 2011
11	St Helens RLFC	28–24	Home	24,057	22 April 2011
12	Wakefield Trinity Wildcats	0–26	Away	8,163	25 April 2011
13	Crusaders RL	16–48	Away	5,037	1 May 2011
14	Harlequins RL	54–6	Home	12,813	13 May 2011
15	Hull Kingston Rovers	40–6	Home	14,779	30 May 2011
16	Catalans Dragons	20–12	Away	9,372	4 June 2011
17	Castleford Tigers	22–22	Away	7,263	12 June 2011
18	St Helens RLFC	10–32	Away	11,540	17 June 2011
19	Huddersfield Giants	46–12	Home	19,169	25 June 2011
20	Leeds Rhinos	26–24	Home	16,426	1 July 2011
3	Castleford Tigers	26–16	Home	13,096	6 July 2011
21	Harlequins RL	6–38	Away	4,423	9 July 2011
22	Wakefield Trinity Wildcats	48–6	Home	13,095	15 July 2011

=== Challenge Cup ===
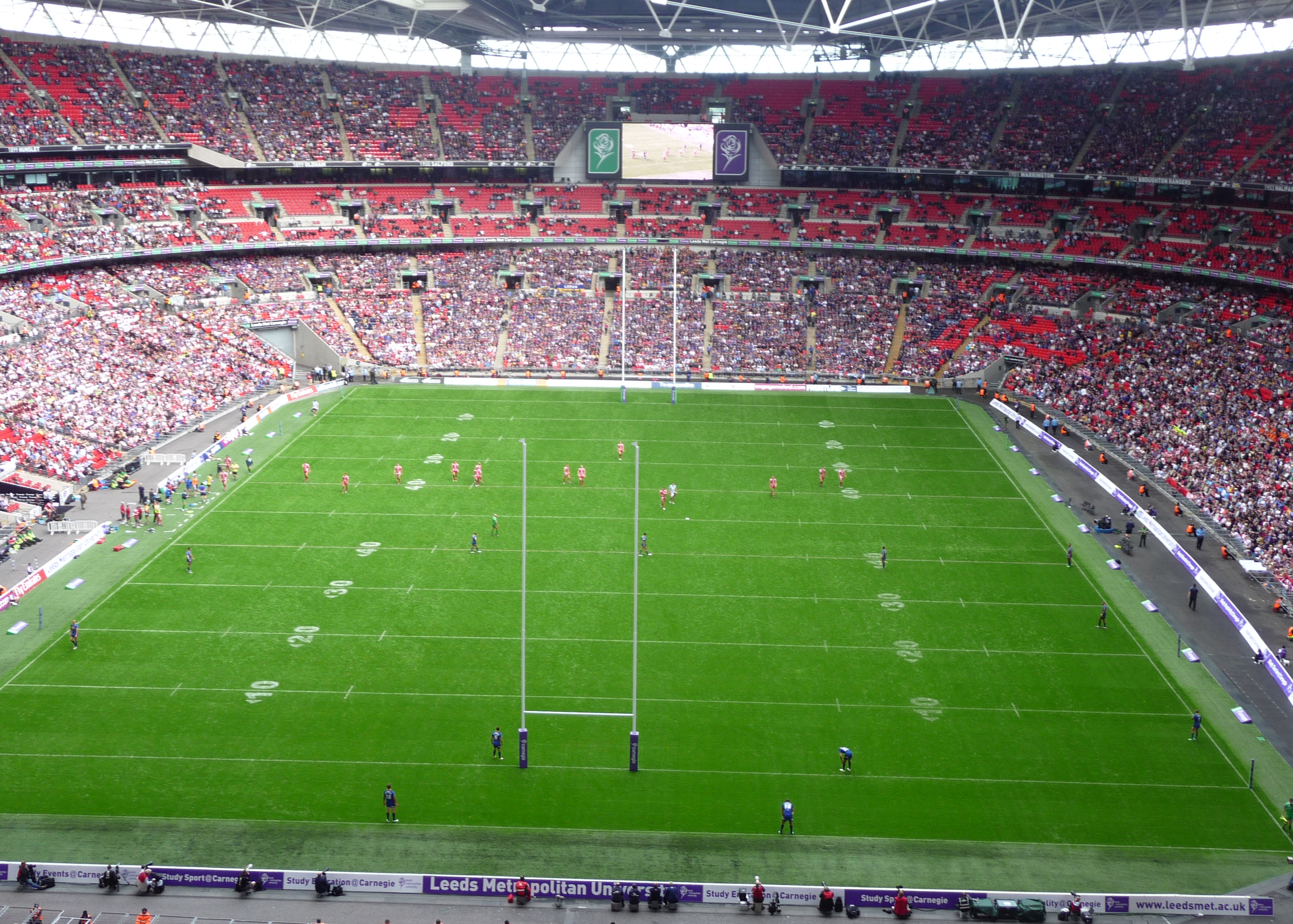
The final at Wembley Stadium

Round	Opponent	Score	H/A	Attendance	Date
4th	Barrow Raiders [C]	52–0	Home	8,026	8 May 2011
5th	Bradford Bulls [SL]	22–26	Away	5,828	22 May 2011
Quarter-final	Warrington Wolves [SL]	24–44	Away	13,105	23 July 2011
Semi-final	St Helens [SL]	18–12	Neutral	12,713	6 August 2011
Final	Leeds Rhinos [SL]	18–28	Neutral	78,482	27 August 2011

== League table ==
Pos	Team	Pld	W	D	L	PF	PA	PD	Pts	Qualification
1	Warrington Wolves (L)	27	22	0	5	1072	401	+671	44	Play-offs
2	Wigan Warriors	27	20	3	4	852	432	+420	43	Play-offs
3	St Helens	27	17	3	7	782	515	+267	37	Play-offs
4	Huddersfield Giants	27	16	0	11	707	524	+183	32	Play-offs
5	Leeds Rhinos (C)	27	15	1	11	757	603	+154	31	Play-offs
6	Catalans Dragons	27	15	1	11	689	626	+63	31	Play-offs
7	Hull Kingston Rovers	27	14	0	13	713	692	+21	28	Play-offs
8	Hull F.C.	27	13	1	13	718	569	+149	27	Play-offs
9	Castleford Tigers	27	12	2	13	664	808	−144	26	
10	Bradford Bulls	27	9	2	16	570	826	−256	20	
11	Salford City Reds	27	10	0	17	542	809	−267	20	
12	Harlequins	27	6	1	20	524	951	−427	13	
13	Wakefield Trinity Wildcats	27	7	0	20	453	957	−504	10 (Note: Wakefield deducted 4 points for entering administration.)	
14	Crusaders	27	6	0	21	527	857	−330	8 (Note: Crusaders deducted 4 points for entering administration.)	

Source: rugbyleagueproject.org
Rules for classification: 1) Points; 2) Points difference; 3) Number of points scored;
(C) Champions; (L) League Leaders' Shield winners
