= Alex Davidson (rugby league) =

English rugby league footballer

Personal information
- Full name: Alexander Davidson
- Born: 1 November 1992 (age 34) Bolton, England
- Height: 6 ft 4 in (1.93 m)
- Weight: 16 st 10 lb (106 kg)

Playing information
- Position: Prop, Second-row
Club
Years	Team	Pld	T	G	FG	P
2011–13	Salford City Reds	3	0	0	0	0
2014	Oldham	5	3	0	0	12
2014(loan)	→ North Wales Crusaders	3	0	0	0	0
2015–16	Gloucestershire All Golds	26	11	0	0	44
2016	South Wales Scorpions	8	1	0	0	4
2017–18	North Wales Crusaders	26	6	0	0	24
	Total	71	21	0	0	84
- Source: As of 13 March 2021

Alexander Davidson is an English professional rugby league footballer who plays for London Skolars.

== Playing career ==
=== Salford Red Devils ===
Previously he has made 3 Super League appearances for the Salford Red Devils. As an amateur, he played second row, but has played mainly at prop in the professional game. Davidson signed for Salford's Academy from amateur club Blackbrook Royals, after previously playing for Wigan St Patrick's and Westhoughton Lions. He has international accolades at under 16 level, after playing in a test series against France Schoolboys in 2009. He made his first team début for Salford in a Round 6 win over Hull Kingston Rovers in 2011's Super League XVI, on 18 March 2011, coming on for Ryan Boyle at prop in the first half.

After a season which began positively, Alex played exclusively in the SL under 20s competition in which Salford City Reds topped the table at the end of the regular season. The decisions by the then head coach, along with the contract rule interpretations, coincided with the team succumbing to two successive losses and not gaining entry to the Grand Final. Overall, the season was successful for Alex and his teammates.

Alex spent the early weeks of 2013 at Leigh Centurions an arrangement which didn't suit either party. On returning to Salford, he had, once again, to prove his worth and eventually did so with the success of the under 20s who eventually beat Featherstone Rovers 32-20 to become Grand Final winners.

During the latter stages of the 2013 season, circumstances forced some younger players forward and among them, Alex appeared as substitute in the Super League matches against Huddersfield Giants (away) and Leeds Rhinos (home).

=== Oldham RLFC ===
Following a loan deal, Alex made his debut for Oldham on 2 February 2014 in a warm up match against Barrow, scoring the first try. Later in that season he was loaned to North Wales Crusaders, playing only 3 matches before an ankle injury ended his season.

=== Gloucestershire All Golds ===
In May 2015 Alex signed with the Gloucestershire All Golds on a one-year deal. He has subsequently agreed terms to remain with the All Golds for 2016.

=== South Wales Scorpions ===
Towards the end of the 2016 season, Alex was loaned to South Wales Scorpions who then started to win some matches and came close to defeating their principality rivals, North Wales Crusaders.

=== North Wales Crusaders ===
Following the demise of Scorpions, Alex joined North Wales Crusaders and had a successful period under coach, Mike Grundy, but with the advent of a replacement coach, he resigned from the team.

=== London Skolars ===
In July 2021, Alex signed for London Skolars and played his debut match for them at home to Doncaster where a 16 all draw was recorded.
