= 2014 Wigan Warriors season =

Wigan Warriors 2014 season
- Super League XIX Rank: 2nd
- Play-off result: Runners-up
- Challenge Cup: Quarter-finals
- 2014 record: Wins: 20; draws: 1; losses: 9
- Points scored: For: 796; against: 563

Team information
- Chairman: Ian Lenagan
- Head Coach: Shaun Wane
- Captain: Sean O'Loughlin
- Stadium: DW Stadium

Top scorers
- Tries: Joe Burgess (25)
- Points: Matty Smith (285)
← 2013	List of seasons	2015 →

The Wigan Warriors play Rugby League in Wigan, England. Their 2014 season results in the Super League XIX, 2014 Challenge Cup, and 2014 World Club Challenge are shown below.

== World Club Challenge ==
As winners of the 2013 Super League Grand Final, Wigan Warriors qualified for the 2014 World Club Challenge. The game, which took place in Australia, saw Wigan lose to Sydney Roosters, champions of the 2013 NRL Grand Final.

Date	Opponent	H/A	Result	Scorers	Att.
19 February 2017	Sydney Roosters	A	14–36		31,515

== Super League ==
=== Regular season ===
==== Matches ====
Date	Opponent	H/A	Result	Scorers	Att.	Pos.	Ref.
7 February 2014	Huddersfield Giants	H	8–24		16,240		
2 March 2014	Wakefield Trinity Wildcats	H	46–24		11,703		
9 March 2014	Castleford Tigers	A	31–36		8,504		
14 March 2014	Hull KR	H	34–20		12,801		
20 March 2014	Warrington Wolves	A	12–4		11,550		
28 March 2014	Catalans Dragons	H	22–16		11,216		
11 April 2014	London Broncos	H	36–14		10,680		
18 April 2014	St Helens	A	33–14		17,980		
21 April 2014	Bradford Bulls	H	84–6		15,529		
2 May 2014	Leeds Rhinos	A	12–28		18,139		
9 May 2014	Hull F.C.	A	44–16		10,539		
17 May 2014	Leeds Rhinos	N	18–14		36,399		
22 May 2014	Salford Red Devils	A	25–4		3,706		
29 May 2014	Huddersfield Giants	A	22–31		6,106		
13 June 2014	Castleford Tigers	H	46–6		11,914		
18 June 2014	Widnes Vikings	H	48–8		11,638		
22 June 2014	Wakefield Trinity Wildcats	A	28–36		4,069		
27 June 2014	St Helens	H	12–16		20,224		
5 July 2014	London Broncos	A	56–6		2,013		
12 July 2014	Catalans Dragons	A	37–16		7,498		
18 July 2014	Hull F.C.	H	56–10		12,493		
27 July 2014	Bradford Bulls	A	8–16		6,535		
31 July 2014	Salford Red Devils	H	45–4		12,962		
14 August 2014	Hull KR	A	14–14		6,801		
29 August 2014	Widnes Vikings	A	10–24		6,223		
5 September 2014	Leeds Rhinos	H	21–6		20,265		
11 September 2014	Warrington Wolves	H	24–20		15,656		

==== Table ====
Super League XIX
Pos	Team	Pld	W	D	L	PF	PA	PD	Pts	Qualification
1	St Helens (L, C)	27	19	0	8	796	563	+233	38	Play-offs
2	Wigan Warriors	27	18	1	8	834	429	+405	37	Play-offs
3	Huddersfield Giants	27	17	3	7	785	626	+159	37	Play-offs
4	Castleford Tigers	27	17	2	8	814	583	+231	36	Play-offs
5	Warrington Wolves	27	17	1	9	793	515	+278	35	Play-offs
6	Leeds Rhinos	27	15	2	10	685	421	+264	32	Play-offs
7	Catalans Dragons	27	14	1	12	733	667	+66	29	Play-offs
8	Widnes Vikings	27	13	1	13	611	725	−114	27	Play-offs
9	Hull Kingston Rovers	27	10	3	14	627	665	−38	23	
10	Salford Red Devils	27	11	1	15	608	695	−87	23	
11	Hull F.C.	27	10	2	15	653	586	+67	22	
12	Wakefield Trinity Wildcats	27	10	1	16	557	750	−193	21	
13	Bradford Bulls (R)	27	8	0	19	512	984	−472	10 (Note: Bradford Bulls deducted 6 points on 25 February 2014 for entering administration)	Relegation to Championship
14	London Broncos (R)	27	1	0	26	438	1237	−799	2	Relegation to Championship

(C) Champions; (L) League Leaders' Shield Winners; (R) Relegated

=== Play-offs ===
Date	Round	Opponent	H/A	Result	Scorers	Att.	Ref.
18 September 2014	Qualifying play-offs	Huddersfield Giants	H	57–4		8,562	
2 October 2014	Qualifying Semi-Final	Warrington Wolves	H	16–12		15,023	
11 October 2014	Grand Final	St Helens	N	6–14		70,102	

== Challenge Cup ==
After finishing second in the Super League XVI, Wigan Warriors entered the 2014 Challenge Cup at the fourth round. Last year's winners won in the fourth and fifth rounds before being eliminated by Castleford Tigers in the quarter finals.

Date	Round	Opponent	H/A	Result	Scorers	Att.
4 April 2014	Fourth Round	Dewsbury Rams	A	56–6		3,054
27 April 2014	Fifth Round	Huntley Hawks	H	52–8		4,390
7 June 2014	Quarter Final	Castleford Tigers	H	4–16		8,736
