= 2013 Wigan Warriors season =

Wigan Warriors 2013 season
- Super League XVIII champions 2013 Challenge Cup champions
- Super League XVIII Rank: 4th
- Play-off result: Champions
- Challenge Cup: Champions
- 2013 record: Wins: 23; draws: 1; losses: 9
- Points scored: For: 816; against: 460

Team information
- Chairman: Ian Lenagan
- Head Coach: Shaun Wane
- Captain: Sean O'Loughlin
- Stadium: DW Stadium

Top scorers
- Tries: Josh Charnley (43)
- Points: Pat Richards (294)
← 2012	List of seasons	2014 →

The Wigan Warriors play Rugby League in Wigan, England. Their 2013 season results in the Super League XVIII and 2013 Challenge Cup are shown below.

== Super League ==
=== Regular season ===
==== Matches ====
Date	Opponent	H/A	Result	Scorers	Att.	Pos.
1 February 2013	Salford Red Devils	A	24–0		5,383	
8 February 2013	Warrington Wolves	H	17–17		20,050	
16 February 2013	Huddersfield Giants	A	10–22		8,023	
24 February 2013	London Broncos	H	48–18		11,590	
3 March 2013	Castleford Tigers	A	28–22		7,852	
8 March 2013	Catalans Dragons	H	38–0		12,149	
15 March 2013	Leeds Rhinos	A	18–14		15,224	
23 March 2013	Widnes Vikings	H	62–4		11,904	
29 March 2013	St Helens	H	28–16		23,390	
1 April 2013	Hull KR	A	84–6		7,894	
7 April 2013	Wakefield Trinity Wildcats	H	44–24		12,152	
14 April 2013	Bradford Bulls	A	36–6		9,899	
26 April 2013	Hull F.C.	A	28–20		11,403	
3 May 2013	Salford Red Devils	H	46–6		12,489	
18 May 2013	London Broncos	A	64–6		3,594	
26 May 2013	Leeds Rhinos	N	20–16		31,249	
2 June 2013	Wakefield Trinity Wildcats	A	36–23		8,459	
7 June 2013	Widnes Vikings	A	33–32		6,528	
24 June 2013	Warrington Wolves	A	22–12		14,028	
2 July 2017	Widnes Vikings	H	28–12		12,758	
28 June 2013	Castleford Tigers	H	4–18		12,463	
5 July 2013	Bradford Bulls	H	26–20		13,213	
22 July 2013	St Helens	A	16–22		14,204	
2 August 2013	Hull KR	H	21–16		12,194	
9 August 2013	Huddersfield Giants	H	12–30		19,620	
22 August 2013	Catalans Dragons	A	8–22		8,968	
30 August 2013	Hull F.C.	H	33–34		12,417	
5 September 2013	Leeds Rhinos	H	6–20		14,982	

==== Table ====
Super League XVIII
Pos	Team	Pld	W	D	L	PF	PA	PD	Pts	Qualification
1	Huddersfield Giants (L)	27	21	0	6	851	507	+344	42	Play-offs
2	Warrington Wolves	27	20	1	6	836	461	+375	41	Play-offs
3	Leeds Rhinos	27	18	1	8	712	507	+205	37	Play-offs
4	Wigan Warriors (C)	27	17	1	9	816	460	+356	35	Play-offs
5	St. Helens	27	15	1	11	678	536	+142	31	Play-offs
6	Hull F.C.	27	13	2	12	652	563	+89	28	Play-offs
7	Catalans Dragons	27	13	2	12	619	604	+15	28	Play-offs
8	Hull Kingston Rovers	27	13	0	14	642	760	−118	26	Play-offs
9	Bradford Bulls	27	10	2	15	640	658	−18	22	
10	Widnes Vikings	27	10	2	15	695	841	−146	22	
11	Wakefield Trinity Wildcats	27	10	1	16	660	749	−89	21	
12	Castleford Tigers	27	9	2	16	702	881	−179	20	
13	London Broncos	27	5	2	20	487	946	−459	12	
14	Salford City Reds	27	6	1	20	436	953	−517	11 (Note: Salford deducted 2 points on 14 June 2013 for fielding 14 players during home game against Castleford)	

Source: superleague.co.uk and BBC Sport
Rules for classification: 1st on competition points; 2nd on match points difference. Competition points: for win = 2; for draw = 1; for loss = 0.
(C) Champions; (L) League Leaders' Shield Winners

=== Play-offs ===
Date	Round	Opponent	H/A	Result	Scorers	Att.
12 September 2013	Qualifying play-offs	Huddersfield Giants	A	22–8		8,000
27 September 2013	Qualifying Semi-Final	Leeds Rhinos	H	22–12		14,600
5 October 2013	Grand Final	Warrington Wolves	N	30–16		66,281

== Challenge Cup ==
After finishing first in the Super League XVII as league leaders, Wigan Warriors entered the 2013 Challenge Cup at the fourth round. Wins against Leigh Centurions, Hull KR, and Widnes Vikings saw them reach the semi-finals where they nilled London Broncos in a 70 point thrashing. The final saw them nill opponents Hull F.C. to win the 2013 Challenge Cup, their 19th title, after their most last victory in 2011.

Date	Round	Opponent	H/A	Result	Scorers	Att.
19 April 2013	Fourth Round	Leigh Centurions	H	60–10		6,889
12 May 2013	Fifth Round	Hull KR	A	46–14		4,280
15 June 2013	Quarter Final	Widnes Vikings	H	48–4		6,327
27 July 2013	Semi Final	London Broncos	H	70–0		6,274
24 August 2013	Final	Hull F.C.	N	16–0		78,137
