= 2012 Wigan Warriors season =

Wigan Warriors 2012 season
- Super League XVII Rank: 1st
- Play-off result: Qualifying Semi-finals
- Challenge Cup: Semi-finals
- 2012 record: Wins: 25; draws: 0; losses: 7
- Points scored: For: 994; against: 449

Team information
- Chairman: Ian Lenagan
- Head Coach: Shaun Wane
- Captain: Sean O'Loughlin
- Stadium: DW Stadium

Top scorers
- Tries: Sam Tomkins and Josh Charnley (36 each)
- Points: Josh Charnley (294)
← 2011	List of seasons	2013 →

The Wigan Warriors play Rugby League in Wigan, England. Their 2012 season results in the Super League XVII and 2012 Challenge Cup are shown below.

== Super League ==
=== Regular season ===
==== Matches ====
Date	Opponent	H/A	Result	Scorers	Att.	Pos.
5 February 2012	Huddersfield Giants	H	16–20		16,771	
11 February 2012	Leeds Rhinos	H	20–6		15,370	
19 February 2012	Bradford Bulls	A	54–16		15,699	
26 March 2012	Castleford Tigers	A	46–4		8,156	
6 March 2012	Catalans Dragons	H	36–12		14,464	
11 March 2012	Widnes Vikings	A	37–36		7,357	
18 March 2012	London Broncos	H	42–30		12,608	
23 March 2012	Warrington Wolves	H	20–22		21,267	
30 March 2012	Salford Red Devils	A	40–20		6,774	
6 April 2012	St Helens	A	28–10		17,980	
9 April 2012	Wakefield Trinity Wildcats	H	36–6		13,609	
22 April 2012	Hull F.C.	A	56–12		11,549	
4 May 2012	Hull KR	H	36–22		14,457	
18 May 2012	Huddersfield Giants	A	32–12		10,123	
27 May 2012	St Helens	N	42–16		32,953	
1 June 2012	Leeds Rhinos	A	50–8		16,113	
9 June 2012	Catalans Dragons	A	26–39		13,858	
25 June 2012	Widnes Vikings	H	52–12		13,445	
29 June 2012	Bradford Bulls	H	22–30		19,628	
8 July 2012	Wakefield Trinity Wildcats	A	52–10		9,107	
21 July 2012	London Broncos	A	44–6		4,309	
27 July 2012	Castleford Tigers	H	40–16		13,975	
3 July 2012	Hull F.C.	H	48–10		17,736	
10 August 2012	Warrington Wolves	A	10–30		13,859	
11 August 2017	Huddersfield Giants	H	18–14		10,619	
20 August 2012	Salford Red Devils	H	38–6		13,703	
2 September 2012	Hull KR	A	42–36		8,845	
8 September 2012	St Helens	H	18–26		21,522	

==== Table ====
Super League XVII
Pos	Team	Pld	W	D	L	PF	PA	PD	Pts	Qualification
1	Wigan Warriors (L)	27	21	0	6	994	449	+545	42	Play-offs
2	Warrington Wolves	27	20	1	6	909	539	+370	41	Play-offs
3	St Helens	27	17	2	8	795	480	+315	36	Play-offs
4	Catalans Dragons	27	18	0	9	812	611	+201	36	Play-offs
5	Leeds Rhinos (C)	27	16	0	11	823	662	+161	32	Play-offs
6	Hull F.C.	27	15	2	10	696	621	+75	32	Play-offs
7	Huddersfield Giants	27	14	0	13	699	664	+35	28	Play-offs
8	Wakefield Trinity Wildcats	27	13	0	14	633	764	−131	26	Play-offs
9	Bradford Bulls	27	14	1	12	633	756	−123	23 (Note: Bradford Bulls deducted 6 points on 25 July 2012 for entering administration)	
10	Hull Kingston Rovers	27	10	1	16	753	729	+24	21	
11	Salford City Reds	27	8	1	18	618	844	−226	17	
12	London Broncos	27	7	0	20	588	890	−302	14	
13	Castleford Tigers	27	6	0	21	554	948	−394	12	
14	Widnes Vikings	27	6	0	21	532	1082	−550	12	

Source: superleague.co.uk and BBC Sport.
Rules for classification: 1st on competition points; 2nd on match points difference.
Competition points: for win = 2; for draw = 1; for loss = 0.
(C) Champions; (L) League Leaders' Shield Winners

=== Play-offs ===
Date	Round	Opponent	H/A	Result	Scorers	Att.
14 September 2012	Qualifying play-offs	Catalans Dragons	H	46–6		7,232
28 September 2012	Qualifying Semi-Final	Leeds Rhinos	H	12–13		8,235

== Challenge Cup ==
After finishing second in the Super League XVI, Wigan Warriors entered the 2012 Challenge Cup at the fourth round. Their opening game saw them thrash North Wales Crusaders by 94 points. A win in the fifth round against Featherstone Rovers saw them beat derby rivals St Helens in the quarter-finals before losing to their other rivals, Leeds Rhinos, in the semi-finals.

Date	Round	Opponent	H/A	Result	Scorers	Att.	Ref.
16 April 2012	Fourth round	North Wales Crusaders	H	98–4		4,198	
27 April 2012	Fifth round	Featherstone Rovers	A	32–16		4,082	
12 May 2012	Quarter-final	St Helens	H	18–4		12,864	
14 June 2012	Semi-final	Leeds Rhinos	A	28–39		12,860	
