= Michael Greenfield (rugby league) =

Australian rugby league footballer

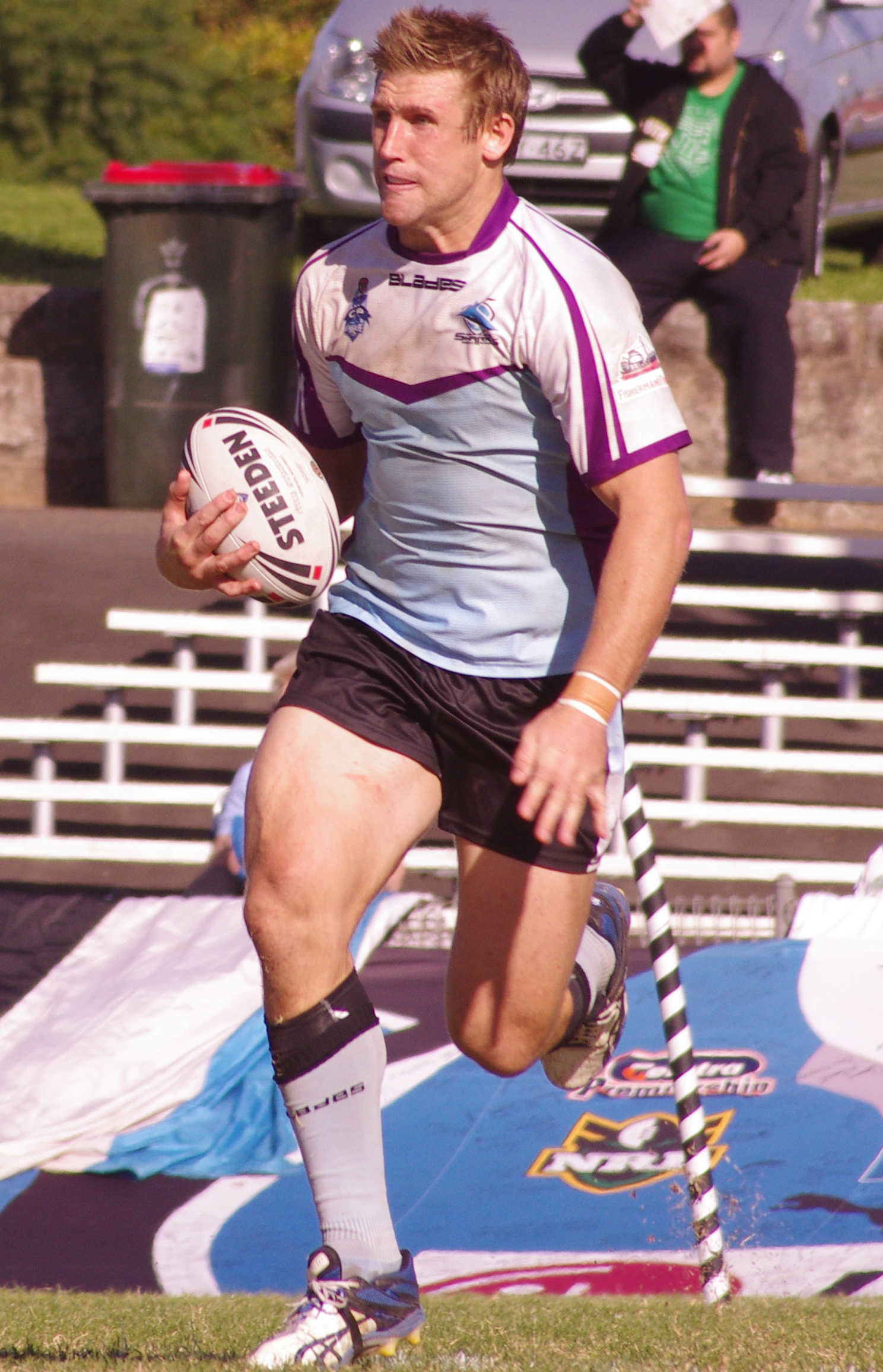

Personal information
- Full name: Michael Anton Greenfield
- Born: 13 September 1985 (age 41) Liverpool, New South Wales, Australia

Playing information
- Height: 191 cm (6 ft 3 in)
- Weight: 112 kg (17 st 9 lb)
- Position: Prop
Club
Years	Team	Pld	T	G	FG	P
2004	Cronulla Sharks	1	0	0	0	0
2006–09	South Sydney	24	1	0	0	4
2010–11	St. George Illawarra	13	0	0	0	0
2012	Melbourne Storm	1	0	0	0	0
	Total	39	1	0	0	4

Michael Anton Greenfield (born 13 September 1985) is an Australian former rugby league player and jailed former union official with the Construction, Forestry and Maritime Employees Union. He played at club level for the Cronulla-Sutherland Sharks, the South Sydney Rabbitohs, the St George Illawarra Dragons, and the Melbourne Storm, in the National Rugby League (NRL), as a prop or second-row. He was a member of the Dragons' 2011 World Club Challenge-winning team.

== Early life ==
Greenfield was born in Liverpool, New South Wales Australia. He was educated at Westfields Sports High School, where he represented 2003 Australian Schoolboys. He started playing rugby league relatively late in his life, having previously played basketball.

Michael played his junior football for Ingleburn Bulldogs.

== Playing career ==
Greenfield started his first-grade career with the Cronulla-Sutherland Sharks, for whom he played one NRL match in 2004. He then moved to the South Sydney Rabbitohs, playing in 24 NRL matches over four seasons. He signed for the St George Illawarra Dragons from the 2010 season, and later extended his contract through the 2011 season.

Greenfield was selected to play in the 2011 World Club Challenge on 27 February 2011 at DW Stadium against the 2010 Super League premiers, Wigan Warriors. St George Illawarra Dragons went on to win the game 21–15. At the end of the 2011 season, he was released from his contract with St George and signed with Melbourne Storm.

He made his Melbourne Storm debut in round 12 of the 2012 NRL season against the Broncos. During his time at Melbourne, he suffered an injury from a shoulder charge which was bad enough to prevent him from continuing to play.

== CFMEU career ==
Following his retirement from rugby, Greenfield became a prominent figure within the Construction, Forestry, Maritime, Mining and Energy Union (CFMEU) NSW branch, holding the position of assistant secretary. His involvement in the union has been marked by significant events and controversies.

As the assistant secretary of the CFMEU NSW, Greenfield played a key role in the union's operations. His responsibilities included negotiating on behalf of the union members, advocating for workers' rights, and participating in high-stakes discussions with construction companies and other industry stakeholders despite not having a previous career in the construction industry.

=== Legal issues ===
Greenfield pleaded guilty to drug possession charges in 2019. He was arrested earlier that year along with two union organisers Nicholas Rekes and Simon Gutierrez during a police operation targeting drug distribution in Sydney's eastern suburbs. He was accused of possessing cocaine, which he bought from his officials.

In 2021, Greenfield and his father, Darren Greenfield, who at that time served as the CFMEU NSW secretary, were arrested and charged with bribery. The charges stemmed from an investigation by the trade union taskforce involving the Australian Federal Police and NSW Police. The Greenfields were accused of soliciting and accepting $5,000 kickbacks from the owner of Lin Betty Building Group, a Chinese construction company, in return for preferential treatment on building sites.

Darren Greenfield was charged with four counts of receiving a corrupting benefit, while Michael Greenfield faced charges of making a false declaration and two counts of receiving a corrupting benefit. The alleged bribery took place between 2018 and 2020. The Greenfields were granted bail with strict conditions, including surrendering their passports, curfews, and daily reporting to their local police stations.

In September 2021, the Australian Labor Party (ALP) suspended Michael and Darren Greenfield from the NSW CFMEU following these bribery allegations. This action was enforced by Chris Minns, the leader of the NSW Labor Party, to distance the party from the controversy and uphold its integrity. On 15 July 2024, Premier Chris Minns has declared that Darren Greenfield should be removed as the union's boss while facing charges before the courts. Despite being suspended from the ALP, Darren Greenfield remains the state boss of the CFMEU. Acting Opposition Leader Damien Tudehope has urged Premier Minns to sever ties with the CFMEU. Premier Minns has stated that Labor will not take donations from the CFMEU other than affiliation fees and mentioned that further action would be taken if new information arises about the CFMEU's NSW branch.

Greenfield resigned from his position on 12 August 2024 amid In allegations of bribery and corruption that were followed by media scrutiny.

In December 2024, it was announced that the investigator for the CFMEU administration, Geoffrey Watson, SC, was looking into $30,000 a month in so far unaccounted payments that the NSW branch transferred directly to the accounts of former secretary and assistant secretary Darren and Michael Greenfield from 2021 to 2023. The payments were discovered as part of a broader investigation into union board resolutions to pay the Greenfields' "reasonable legal expenses" in defending criminal charges over alleged corruption.

The monies sent directly to the Greenfields totaled about $900,000 and were on top of the $559,000 the branch paid to the Greenfields' lawyers in 2022-23 and a further $3.15 million paid to their lawyers in July this year. Administrator Mark Irving, SC, clawed back the latter payment after he took over the union in August.

In a letter sent to former members of the CFMEU branch committee of management (BCOM) this month, seen by The Australian Financial Review, Watson said he was investigating the circumstances behind the $3.15 million payment, who approved it, and its purpose.

In December 2024, father and son Darren and Michael Greenfield were successful in delaying the upcoming fraud charges case due to the High Court challenge regarding the administration of the CFMEU as to who was going to fund their defense team– themselves or use members' money. The Commonwealth lawyer did not oppose this and they were granted a stay until 18 February 2025.

As reported in the national papers, in February 2025, Mark Irving KC the CFMEU administrator received a report from Geoffrey Watson, SC, recommending that Darren and Michael Greenfield face criminal charges for dishonestly using positions to gain a financial advantage concerning the transfer of $3.15 million of members' money to fight bribery charges. The report also recommends that Rita Mallia and Rob Kera face civil proceedings for failing to consider the reasonable expenses they approved for facilitating the 3 million dollar payment.

Anti-corruption expert Geoffrey Watson, SC, also recommended the CFMEU start legal action to recover the "astonishing" sum of up to $890,000 paid to Darren Greenfield and his son Michael for the defense of their bribery charges. An extensive report into criminal conduct was published and the following recommendations were as follows:

1. The President (Rita Mallia), Secretary (Darren Greenfield), Assistant Secretary (Rob Kera), and Assistant Secretary (Michael Greenfield) all committed serious breaches of their duties to the union members.
2. They failed in their duty of care and diligence regarding the union's financial management and violated their duty of good faith.
3. Darren and Michael Greenfield also misused their positions for personal gain.
4. These breaches were significant enough to warrant prosecution and substantial civil penalties.
5. The breaches caused harm to the union and its members, potentially up to $4 million. The union is entitled to recover substantial damages.
6. Darren Greenfield's actions were particularly severe and warrant criminal charges for dishonestly using his position for personal benefit.
7. The Fair Work Commission should be referred to for potential civil penalties against the involved members and legal representatives.

Michael and Darren Greenfield were, again, successful in delaying the bribery charges against them until the pending High Court challenge judgement.

In April 2025, Darren Greenfield and his son Michael, from the NSW branch of the CFMEU, pleaded guilty to corruption and bribery charges, after reaching a plea deal with prosecutors for accepting a total of $30,000 from a building company owner, in exchange for preferential treatment from the union. The Greenfields' lawyer, Paul McGirr, informed the Sydney Local Court on Tuesday 15 April 2025 that a resolution is underway, with negotiations on a statement of facts progressing with the Commonwealth. McGirr expressed confidence that this agreement would be finalised soon.

=== Legal breakthrough ===
Former disgraced CFMEU leaders Darren and Michael Greenfield have indicated their intention to plead guilty to certain charges in their ongoing bribery case. Their lawyer, Paul McGirr, informed the Sydney Local Court on Tuesday 15 April 2025 that a resolution is underway, with negotiations on a statement of facts progressing with the Commonwealth. McGirr expressed confidence that this agreement would be finalized soon .

== Guilty to bribery charges ==
Both father and son pleaded guilty to corruption and bribery charges after reaching a plea deal with prosecutors. The police used cameras hidden in the ceiling of the CFMEU's Sydney office and captured thousands of dollars in cash being handed over to guarantee union support on a building site.

== Sentencing ==
In November 2025, former CFMEU New South Wales secretary Darren Greenfield, and former assistant secretary Michael Greenfield, appeared before the New South Wales District Court for sentencing following their guilty pleas to corrupting benefits offences under the Fair Work Act 2009. The matter was the first prosecution of union officials under the corrupting benefits laws introduced in 2017, and it drew wider public and political attention due to the seniority of the officials involved and the ongoing scrutiny of governance practices within the CFMEU.

=== Background to the offending ===
Court documents outlined that between 2018 and 2020, Michael and Darren Greenfield accepted a total of $20,000 in cash from a subcontractor operating in the Sydney construction market. The payments, delivered in increments of $5,000, were passed to him either at his home or during private interactions at the union office. Michael Greenfield accepted $10,000 over the same period and also arranged for a visa worker, provided by the same subcontractor, to take responsibility for a driving offence on his behalf. The Commonwealth alleged that the payments were offered in the hope of securing favourable treatment on construction sites.

The matter came before the court after a prolonged investigation that commenced in 2020. Both men entered guilty pleas in April 2025, four years after their initial charges. Prior to the guilty pleas, the two officials had used almost $1 million in union funds to defend the case before its committal stage, a factor later raised publicly by critics concerned about union governance and member accountability.

=== Prosecution submissions ===
Commonwealth prosecutors sought custodial sentences of two to three years' imprisonment for each of the Greenfields. They argued that both men held senior positions of authority within the CFMEU and therefore exercised considerable influence over the operations of union delegates, site access, and the enforcement of industrial conditions. Prosecutors contended that accepting payments from industry participants represented a direct conflict with their responsibilities to members and constituted behaviour that undermined the integrity of industrial processes.

The prosecution further submitted that the offending did not represent a single lapse in judgment but rather a pattern of sustained conduct over an 18-month period. They emphasised that the subcontractor involved had been sentenced to a 2½-year intensive corrections order for providing $41,000 in bribes, and argued that the culpability of the Greenfields was greater given their official status and the trust placed in them by union members. Crown counsel argued that the pair's conduct contributed to a "distortion" of the industry environment and demonstrated a willingness to prioritise personal benefit over the interests of workers they were elected to represent.

Prosecutors also tendered evidence that the subcontractor had performed renovation work on Darren Greenfield's home valued at approximately $6,000–$7,000 without payment. The Crown submitted that this further illustrated the pattern of improperly received benefits and contradicted characterisations of the conduct as minor.

=== Defence submissions ===
Counsel for the Greenfields sought intensive corrections orders and argued that the sentences should be served in the community. The defence submitted that the financial amounts involved were comparatively small and that the conduct was out of character for both men, who had long careers in the union movement. Darren Greenfield told a psychologist that the behaviour was inconsistent with his values and arose from what he described as a "moment of weakness".

The defence also stated that the subcontractor had initiated the arrangement and that an unnamed CFMEU delegate—who was not charged—had facilitated introductions and encouraged the subcontractor's belief that personal payments were necessary to secure commercial opportunities. Counsel argued that the subcontractor ultimately received no substantial benefit from the payments, which they said reduced the gravity of the offending.

Further, the defence submitted that the extensive media coverage surrounding the case had imposed significant reputational harm on both men and rendered them effectively unemployable within the construction industry. They argued that these factors should operate as mitigating considerations in determining the appropriate sentence.

=== Judicial consideration ===
The prosecution disputed the defence characterisation of the behaviour as a brief lapse, pointing to the repeated payments and the ongoing nature of the conduct. Crown counsel noted that accepting cash payments on multiple occasions over a long period was inconsistent with claims of momentary weakness or a single lapse in professional judgment.

Judge Leonie Flannery heard arguments concerning the appropriate weight to be given to the duration of the offending, the breach of trust inherent in the conduct of elected union officials, the proportionality of the financial amounts involved, and the broader implications for industrial integrity. The judge also considered comparative sentencing outcomes, including the penalties applied to the subcontractor who supplied the corrupting benefits.

Judge Flannery reserved her judgment and listed 21 November 2025 for the delivery of the final sentencing decision.

== Jail ==
In November 2025, Darren Greenfield, the 60-year-old former New South Wales branch secretary of the Construction, Forestry, Maritime, Mining and Energy Union (CFMEU), and his 40-year-old son Michael Greenfield, the former assistant secretary, were sentenced in the District Court of New South Wales for accepting corrupting benefits under sections 536D and 536G of the Fair Work Act 2009, marking the first convictions under the Act's anti-corruption provisions introduced in 2017 following the trade unions royal commission.

Between November 2018 and June 2020, Darren accepted $20,000 in four cash payments from a subcontractor and union member, while Michael received $10,000 in two payments, in exchange for leveraging their positions to secure preferential treatment on construction sites and award jobs, actions Judge Leonie Flannery described as an "egregious breach of trust" that exploited union influence for personal gain and undermined member welfare.

Darren was sentenced to an aggregate 30 months' imprisonment with a non-parole period of 10 months, eligible for supervised release thereafter on a $500 good behaviour bond;

Michael received 18 months with a six-month minimum jailtime, plus a concurrent two-year community correction order for submitting a false statutory declaration under the Oaths Act 1900 (NSW) to evade a traffic fine by attributing it to a vulnerable overseas worker. Flannery deemed immediate imprisonment necessary for deterrence.

The CFMEU, under federal administration since 2024 amid broader corruption allegations, welcomed the outcome as a rejection of those who "betrayed the members"; Australian Council of Trade Unions secretary Sally McManus condemned the pair, stating: "You can't call yourself a unionist if you're on the take. Those who betray the trust of working people for personal gain have no place in the union movement".
