= Darrell Goulding =

England international rugby league footballer

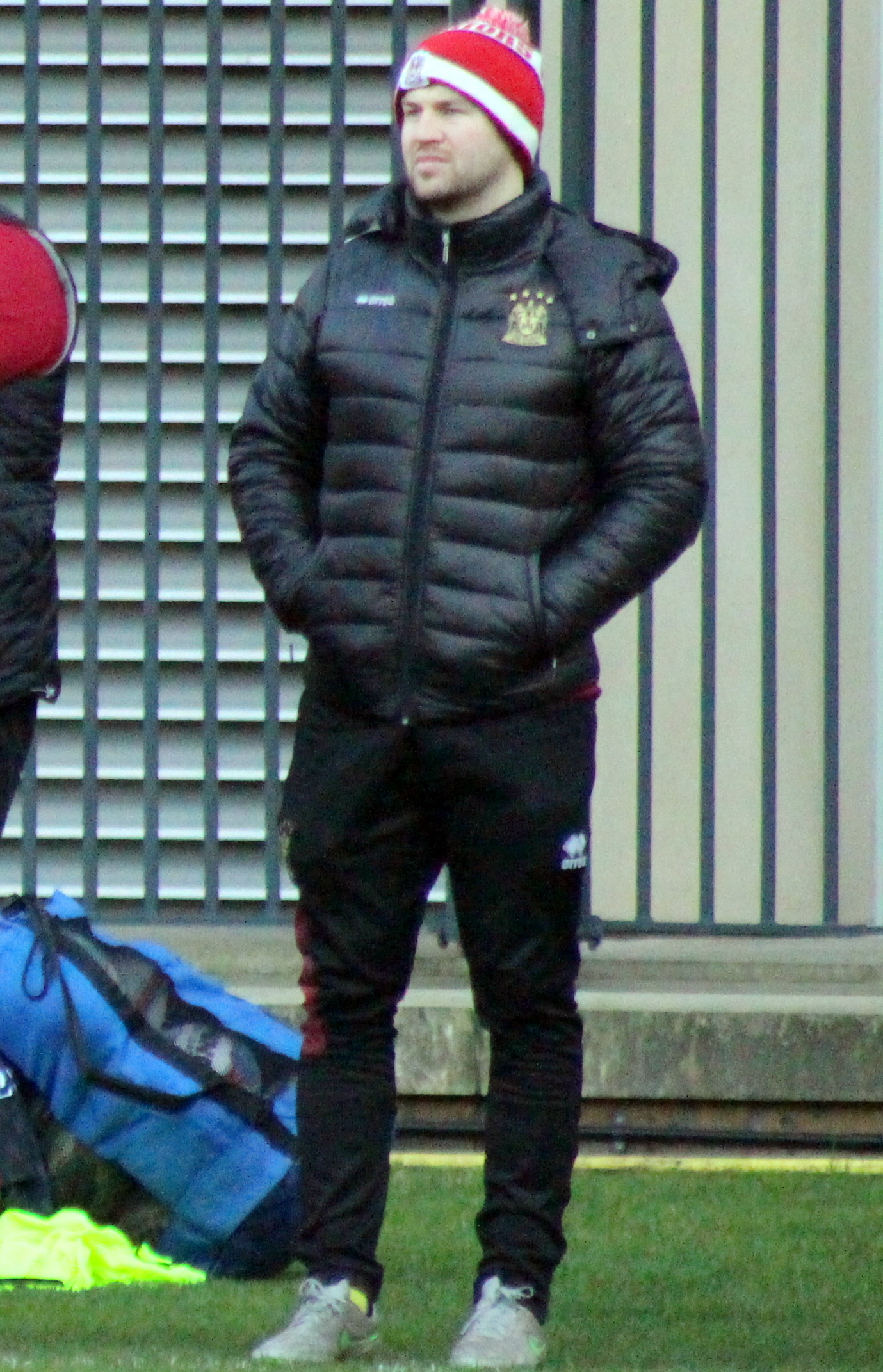

Personal information
- Full name: Darrell Stephen Goulding
- Born: 3 March 1988 (age 37) Wigan, Greater Manchester, England

Playing information
- Height: 5 ft 10 in (1.79 m)
- Weight: 13 st 3 lb (84 kg)
- Position: Centre, Wing
Club
Years	Team	Pld	T	G	FG	P
2005–14	Wigan Warriors	175	72	0	0	288
2009(loan)	→ Salford City Reds	9	5	0	0	20
2015	Hull Kingston Rovers	8	1	0	0	4
	Total	192	78	0	0	312
Representative
Years	Team	Pld	T	G	FG	P
2010	England	2	0	0	0	0

Darrell Goulding (born 3 March 1988) is an English former professional rugby league footballer. He spent nine years of his career with Wigan Warriors, with whom he won the Super League Grand Final in 2010 and 2013, and also played for Hull Kingston Rovers and Salford City Reds in the Super League. He played as either a centre or on the wing.

== Early life ==
Goulding was born in Wigan, Greater Manchester, England, he is a former St. Edmund Arrowsmith pupil. he played for the junior amateur club Wigan St. Patrick's in Ince, Wigan. He was part of Wigan's scholarship scheme and played in Wigan's Academy U18s in 2004 and U21s in 2005.

== Club career ==
=== Wigan ===
Goulding signed a two-year full-time contract with Wigan in July 2005, and was drafted into the first team squad for the first time in August 2005 and shortly after made his début against Widnes.

Goulding scored his first try for Wigan in the 48-22 loss to Leeds on 9 June 2006.

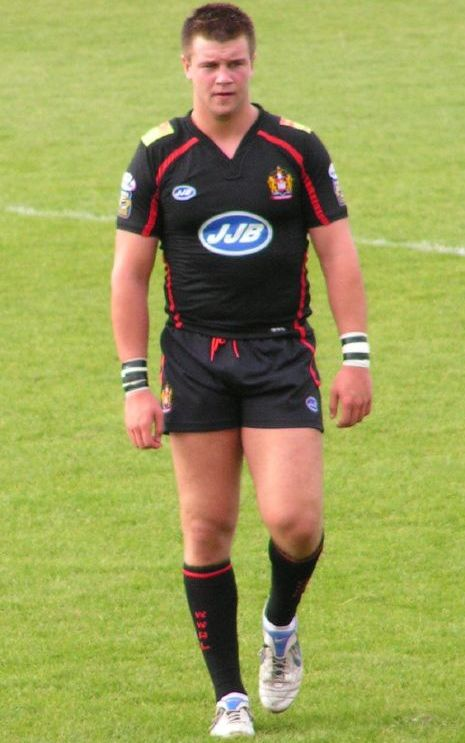
Goulding while playing for Wigan in 2007

On 6 April 2009, Warrington centre Martin Gleeson transferred to Wigan in a deal rumoured to involve Goulding, since he had only been played twice in Wigan's first ten Super League matches. However, this rumour was rejected when Goulding was released on loan to Salford on 14 April.

Goulding made his Reds' début in Perpignan, France in the defeat by the Catalans Dragons. He made his home début a week later at the Willows, scoring two tries - including a 70-metre interception score against Hull. He added a third for the Salford club in his next Super League game - the away victory at Huddersfield.

After returning to Wigan in 2010, Goulding had a breakthrough year, filling in for the injured Amos Roberts for the majority of games. He finished the year with 20 appearances and 25 tries, joint second highest scorer in 2010.

Goulding played in the 2010 Super League Grand Final victory over St. Helens at Old Trafford.

His 2011 season started against St. Helens at the season-opening Magic Weekend event. After opening his try tally at Bradford Bulls in Round 2, he scored again at Salford in Round 4 and featured in the 2011 World Club Challenge team that lost to St George Illawarra Dragons. Goulding made five further consecutive appearances, including a try in Round 8 against Leeds, but was dropped after their loss in Round 9 to Catalans Dragons, in which Goulding's error under the high ball had handed Frédéric Vaccari a try. He reappeared for Wigan's Round 13 victory over Crusaders RL.

He played in the 2013 Challenge Cup Final victory over Hull F.C. at Wembley Stadium.

It was Goulding who also scored the try just before half time in Wigan's 2013 Grand Final win over the Warrington Wolves. His try brought the score back to 16-6 after the Warriors went 16-2 down and Wigan came back in the second half to win 30-16 at Old Trafford.

=== Hull KR ===
In July 2014, Hull Kingston Rovers announced that Goulding had signed a three-year contract with the club starting from the 2015 season. Just 8 matches into his Hull KR career, however, Goulding was forced to retire from the sport due to a string of concussion injuries. His retirement was formally announced on Monday 1 June 2015.

== International career ==
Goulding was selected for Lancashire U17s, England U15 and U16s while part of the Wigan scholarship system. He was also included in the England U17s squad to take on the touring Australian Institute of Sport in 2005. In September 2010 he was called into the senior England squad for the first time for the 2010 Four Nations series in Australia and New Zealand, starting against the Kiwis in a 24-10 defeat in Wellington and also against the Kangaroos in a 34-14 defeat in Melbourne.
