= 2011 World Club Challenge =

Intercontinental rugby league match

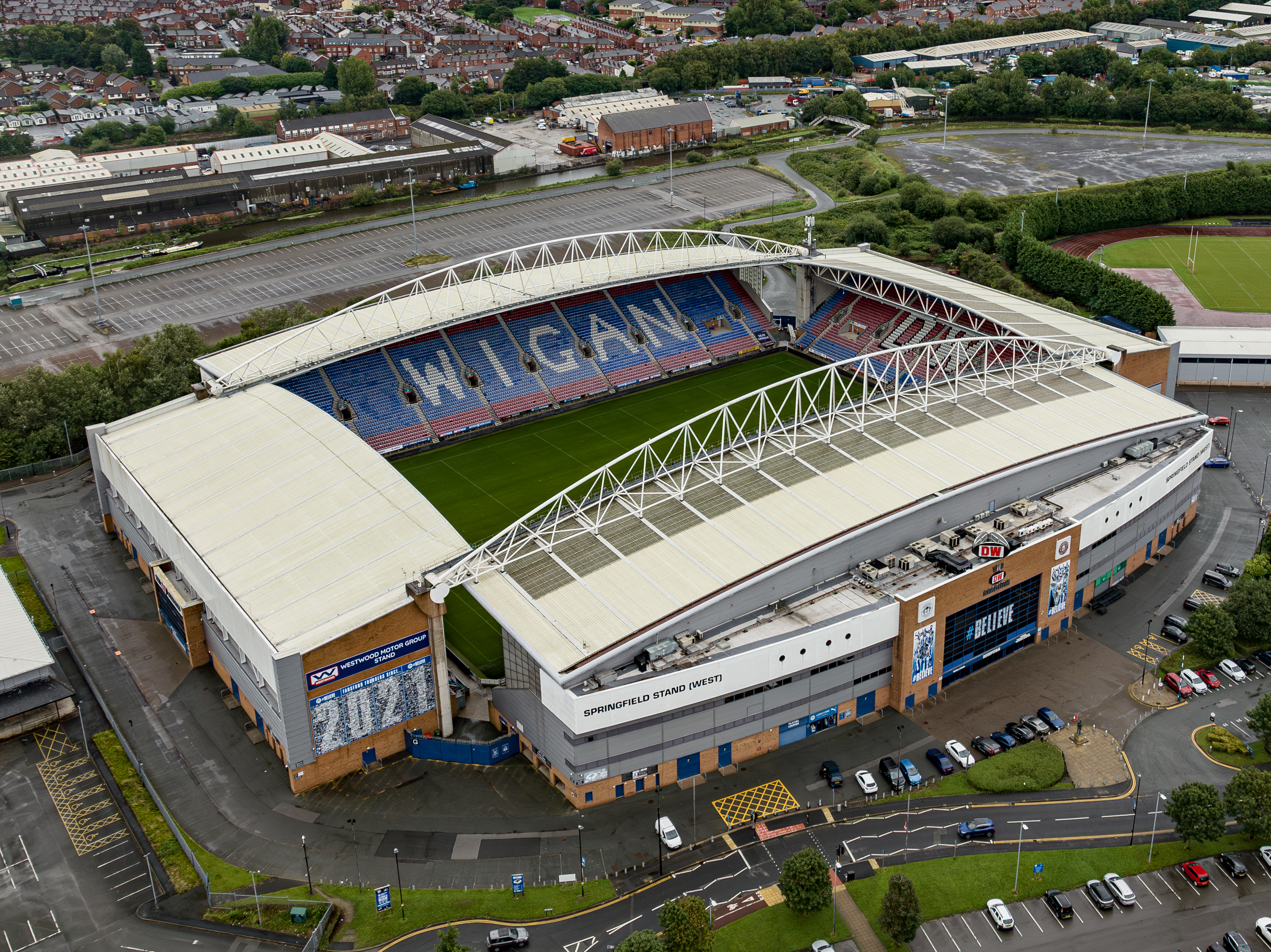
- The DW Stadium hosted the match
Wigan Warriors	St. George Illawarra Dragons
(Super League)	(National Rugby League)
15	21
	1	2	Total
WIG	15	0	15
STG	14	7	21
- Date: 27 February 2011
- Stadium: DW Stadium
- Location: Wigan, England
- Man of the Match: Brett Morris
- Referee: (France) Thierry Alibert
- Attendance: 24,268

Broadcast partners
- Broadcasters: (United Kingdom) Sky Sports (Live); (Australia) Fox Sports (Live); (Australia) Channel 9 (Delay)

The 2011 World Club Challenge (known as the Probiz World Club Challenge due to sponsorship) was contested by Super League XV champions, Wigan Warriors, and 2010 NRL Premiers, the St. George Illawarra Dragons, at Wigan's home ground, DW Stadium. The match was won by St George-Illawarra.

== Qualification ==
=== Wigan Warriors ===
The Wigan Warriors qualified for what was their fifth World Club Challenge by defeating St. Helens 22–10 in the 2010 Super League Grand Final. For Wigan, the World Club Challenge was played in place of their 2011 Super League season Round 3 match, which was rescheduled.

=== St. George Illawarra Dragons ===
St. George Illawarra qualified for what was their first World Club Challenge by defeating the Sydney Roosters 32–8 in the 2010 NRL Grand Final. Rather than play a warm-up match in England as other visiting NRL teams had done, after two pre-season trial match victories in Sydney, the Dragons travelled to London, trained, then moved on to Manchester for the World Club Challenge.

== Match details ==
The Wigan side was without their grand final players Pat Richards (wing) and Stuart Fielden (forward) due to injury. Mark Riddell (hooker) was also absent, having moved to another club. The St. George Illawarra side was without their grand final players Neville Costigan (forward), Jeremy Smith (forward) and Jarrod Saffy (forward) who had moved to other clubs. Dean Young (hooker) was also absent due to injury.

The match was broadcast by Sky Sports with commentary from Eddie Hemmings, Mike Stephenson, Phil Clarke, Brian Carney, Bill Arthur.

27 February
19:15 GMT

Wigan Warriors	15 – 21	St George Illawarra Dragons
Tries: George Carmont (2) Goals: Paul Deacon (3); Drop Goal: Sam Tomkins	Report	Tries: Brett Morris (2); Matt Cooper; Cameron King; Goals: Jamie Soward (2); Field Goal: Jamie Soward

DW Stadium, Wigan
Attendance: 24,268
Referee: Thierry Alibert (France)
Player of the Match: Brett Morris

Wigan Warriors	Pos.	St. George Illawarra Dragons
Sam Tomkins 1	FB	1 Darius Boyd
Darrell Goulding 2	WG	2 Brett Morris
Martin Gleeson 3	CE	3 Mark Gasnier
George Carmont 4	CE	4 Matt Cooper
Amos Roberts 19	WG	5 Jason Nightingale
Paul Deacon 6	SO/FE	6 Jamie Soward
Thomas Leuluai 7	SH/HB	7 Ben Hornby (c)
Paul Prescott 14	PR	8 Dan Hunt
Michael McIlorum 9	HK	9 Nathan Fien
Andy Coley 10	PR	10 Michael Weyman
Harrison Hansen 11	SR	11 Beau Scott
Ryan Hoffman 16	SR	12 Ben Creagh
(c) Sean O'Loughlin 13	LF	13 Matt Prior
Joel Tomkins 12	Int.	14 Michael Greenfield
Lee Mossop 21	Int.	15 Trent Merrin
Liam Farrell 22	Int.	16 Jon Green
Chris Tuson 23	Int.	19 Cameron King
Michael Maguire	Coach	Steve Price^{1}

For this match against the Dragons, whose colours are also red and white, Wigan wore mostly black jerseys.

A minute's silence was observed for the February 2011 Christchurch earthquake at the near capacity stadium before Wigan kicked off. By the end of the home side's very first set of six they had worked their way down to within ten metres of the opposition's try-line. Wigan stand-off half Paul Deacon then got the ball at first receiver and sent a kick up and over to the left part of the line where leaping centre George Carmont snatched it from the air and scored. The conversion was successful, so the Super League champions led 6-0 after only two minutes.

Just over a minute later Dragons hooker Nathan Fein conceded a penalty for a high tackle. Wigan took the kick, the boot of Deacon extending their lead to 8-0.

By the tenth minute The visitors had some ball in an attacking position and managed to move it through the hands out to Brett Morris on the wing who dived over for a try in the corner. Jamie Soward's conversion attempt missed so the score remained 8-4 in favour of Wigan.

St. George Illawarra had again made their way past their opponents' ten-metre line and in the seventeenth minute passed the ball out to the right once again, where centre Matt Cooper crashed over the try-line. Soward's kick got his team another two points and now the visitors were leading 8-10.

Just before the twenty-one-minute mark the Dragons were penalised in their own half when Beau Scott took too long to get off a tackled player. The home side decided to take the kick at goal but Deacon missed. However immediately upon receiving St. George Illawarra's kick off, George Carmont made a break inside his own half and raced sixty metres to score untouched under the posts, putting Wigan in front once more. Deacon added the extras so the score was 14-10.

In the twenty-ninth minute The Dragons had almost reached the opposition's twenty-metre line when they once more strung passes together over to their left wing where Brett Morris crashed over near the corner. Soward missed the conversion attempt so the NRL and Super League champions were level at 14-14.

In the final seconds of the first half, Wigan were down close to the visitors' try-line and the ball went to Sam Tomkins who kicked a drop-goal. The home side thus went into the break leading 15-14.

The first fifteen minutes of the second half were played across the field from end-to-end, with neither side able to convert their scoring opportunities into points until St. George Illawarra bench player Cameron King at close range forced his way over the try-line from dummy-half. Jamie Soward converted and the Australian club re-gained the lead at 15-20.

The attacking raids from both sides continued without points until the seventieth minute when Soward opted for a drop-goal from twenty metres out and got it. The Dragons were now leading by a converted try at 15-21. Despite good attacking opportunities in the remaining ten minutes of the match, Wigan were unable to score, so St. George Illawarra had claimed their first World Club Challenge.

It was the third year in a row that the NRL had won the World Club Championship match; although in the case of 2010, the title was later stripped from the Melbourne Storm and withheld after the club was found guilty of breaching the NRL's salary cap, more than one year since the initial penalties were announced.

^{1} Wayne Bennett was not present with the Dragons squad; he was forced to return to Australia to be by his ill mother-in-law's side. Steve Price stepped in as caretaker coach.
