= 2011 Super League season results =

Rugby league competition results

This is a list of the 2011 Super League season results. Super League is the top-flight rugby league competition in the United Kingdom and France. The 2011 season started on 12 February, with the Magic Weekend at the Millennium Stadium in Cardiff, and ended on 8 October with the 2011 Super League Grand Final.

The 2011 Super League season consisted of two stages. The regular season was played over 27 round-robin fixtures, in which each of the fourteen teams involved in the competition played each other once at home and once away, as well as their Magic Weekend fixtures played over the first round of the season. In Super League XVI, a win was worth two points in the table, a draw worth one point apiece, and a loss yielded no points.

The league leaders at the end of the regular season received the League Leaders' Shield, but the Championship was decided through the second stage of the season—the play-offs. The top eight teams in the table contested to play in the 2011 Super League Grand Final, the winners of which, Leeds Rhinos, were crowned Super League XVI Champions.

== Regular season ==
=== Round 1 ===
Home	Score	Away	Match Information
Home	Score	Away	Date and Time	Venue	Referee	Attendance
Huddersfield Giants	28–18	Warrington Wolves	12 February, 13:00 GMT	Millennium Stadium^{A}	Ben Thaler	30,891
Harlequins RL	11–4	Catalans Dragons	12 February, 15:00 GMT	Millennium Stadium	Robert Hicks	30,891
Castleford Tigers	40–20	Wakefield Trinity Wildcats	12 February, 17:00 GMT	Millennium Stadium	Jamie Child	30,891
St. Helens	16–16	Wigan Warriors	12 February, 19:00 GMT	Millennium Stadium	Richard Silverwood	30,891
Salford City Reds	12–42	Crusaders	13 February, 12:00 GMT	Millennium Stadium	Thierry Alibert	29,323
Leeds Rhinos	32–28	Bradford Bulls	13 February, 14:00 GMT	Millennium Stadium	Steve Ganson	29,323
Hull	22–34	Hull Kingston Rovers	13 February, 16:00 GMT	Millennium Stadium	Phil Bentham	29,323

=== Round 2 ===
Home	Score	Away	Match Information
Home	Score	Away	Date and Time	Venue	Referee	Attendance
Hull FC	18–32	Leeds Rhinos	18 February, 20:00 GMT	KC Stadium	Richard Silverwood	12,513
Salford City Reds	22–56	St. Helens	18 February, 20:00 GMT	The Willows	Robert Hicks	5,929
Catalans Dragons	18–34	Wakefield Trinity Wildcats	19 February, 17:30 GMT / 18:30 CET	Stade Gilbert Brutus	Ben Thaler	7,500
Castleford Tigers	18–12	Huddersfield Giants	19 February, 18:00 GMT	Probiz Coliseum	Steve Ganson	5,992
Harlequins RL	20–18	Crusaders	20 February, 14:00 GMT	Twickenham Stoop	Jamie Child	1,766
Bradford Bulls	10–44	Wigan Warriors	20 February, 15:00 GMT	Odsal	Phil Bentham	15,348
Warrington Wolves	24–22	Hull KR	20 February, 15:00 GMT	Halliwell Jones Stadium	Thierry Alibert	10,899

=== Round 3 ===
Home	Score	Away	Match Information
Home	Score	Away	Date and Time	Venue	Referee	Attendance
Leeds Rhinos	26–36	Harlequins RL	25 February, 20:00 GMT	Headingley Stadium	Ben Thaler	14,350
St. Helens	18–25	Warrington Wolves	25 February, 20:00 GMT	Halton Stadium^{B}	Phil Bentham	10,514
Crusaders RL	26–30	Bradford Bulls	26 February, 17:45 GMT	Racecourse Ground	Richard Silverwood	2,615
Huddersfield Giants	20–10	Hull FC	27 February, 15:00 GMT	Galpharm Stadium	Robert Hicks	8,822
Hull KR	18–31	Catalans Dragons	27 February, 15:00 GMT	Craven Park	Jamie Child	8,092
Wakefield Trinity Wildcats	6–32	Salford City Reds	27 February, 15:30 GMT	Belle Vue	Steve Ganson	6,823
Wigan Warriors	26–16	Castleford Tigers	6 July, 20:00 GMT	DW Stadium	Phil Bentham	13,096

=== Round 4 ===
Home	Score	Away	Match Information
Home	Score	Away	Date and Time	Venue	Referee	Attendance
Harlequins RL	10–18	Huddersfield Giants	4 March, 20:00 GMT	Twickenham Stoop	Phil Bentham	2,624
Hull FC	42–18	Crusaders	4 March, 20:00 GMT	Kingston Communications Stadium	Ben Thaler	10,422
Salford City Reds	16–32	Wigan Warriors	4 March, 20:00 GMT	The Willows	Jamie Childs	6,266
Catalans Dragons	16–22	St. Helens	5 March, 17:30 GMT / 18:30 CET	Stade Gilbert Brutus	Thierry Alibert	7,095
Warrington Wolves	40–24	Leeds Rhinos	5 March, 17:45 GMT	Halliwell Jones Stadium	Steve Ganson	11,438
Bradford Bulls	40–18	Wakefield Trinity Wildcats	6 March, 15:00 GMT	Odsal Stadium	Robert Hicks	12,835
Castleford Tigers	27–14	Hull KR	6 March, 15:30 GMT	Probiz Coliseum	Richard Silverwood	8,537

=== Round 5 ===
Home	Score	Away	Match Information
Home	Score	Away	Date and Time	Venue	Referee	Attendance
Leeds Rhinos	46–12	Salford City Reds	11 March, 20:00 GMT	Headingley Carnegie Stadium	Thierry Alibert	13,068
St. Helens	16–27	Harlequins RL	11 March, 20:00 GMT	Stobart Stadium Halton^{B}	Gareth Hewer	6,050
Wakefield Trinity Wildcats	6–22	Warrington Wolves	11 March, 20:00 GMT	Belle Vue	Richard Silverwood	5,072
Castleford Tigers	34–24	Catalans Dragons	12 March, 17:45 GMT	The Jungle	Phil Bentham	4,889
Huddersfield Giants	50–16	Bradford Bulls	13 March, 15:00 GMT	Galpharm Stadium	Jamie Child	9,466
Wigan Warriors	14–12	Hull FC	13 March, 15:00 GMT	DW Stadium	Steve Ganson	15,346
Hull KR	40–22	Crusaders	13 March, 15:00 GMT	Craven Park	Robert Hicks	8,602

=== Round 6 ===
Home	Score	Away	Match Information
Home	Score	Away	Date and Time	Venue	Referee	Attendance
Huddersfield Giants	6–20	Wigan Warriors	18 March, 20:00 GMT	Galpharm Stadium	Ben Thaler	8,151
Salford City Reds	34–18	Hull Kingston Rovers	18 March, 20:00 GMT	The Willows	Gareth Hewer	4,408
Hull	6–20	Wakefield Trinity Wildcats	18 March, 20:00 GMT	Kingston Communications Stadium	Thierry Alibert	11,032
Crusaders	22–32	Catalans Dragons	18 March, 20:00 GMT	Racecourse Ground	Jamie Child	3,517
Leeds Rhinos	16–30	St. Helens	19 March, 17:45 GMT	Headingley Carnegie Stadium	Richard Silverwood	16,034
Warrington Wolves	82–6	Harlequins RL	20 March, 15:00 GMT	Halliwell Jones Stadium	Steve Ganson	11,506
Bradford Bulls	18–14	Castleford Tigers	20 March, 15:00 GMT	Odsal Stadium	Robert Hicks	14,348

=== Round 7 ===
Home	Score	Away	Match Information
Home	Score	Away	Date and Time	Venue	Referee	Attendance
St. Helens	28–16	Bradford Bulls	25 March, 20:00 GMT	Stobart Stadium Halton	Richard Silverwood	7,676
Wigan Warriors	6–24	Warrington Wolves	25 March, 20:00 GMT	DW Stadium	Thierry Alibert	21,056
Catalans Dragons	10–22	Salford City Reds	26 March, 18:30 GMT	Stade Gilbert Brutus	Robert Hicks	7,156
Hull Kingston Rovers	16–38	Huddersfield Giants	26 March, 17:45 GMT	Craven Park	Steve Ganson	7,502
Harlequins RL	30–40	Hull	27 March, 14:00 BST	Twickenham Stoop	Phil Bentham	3,052
Castleford Tigers	56–16	Crusaders	27 March, 15:30 BST	The Jungle	Ben Thaler	6,030
Wakefield Trinity Wildcats	6–28	Leeds Rhinos	27 March, 15:30 BST	Belle Vue	Jamie Child	8,763

=== Round 8 ===
Home	Score	Away	Match Information
Home	Score	Away	Date and Time	Venue	Referee	Attendance
Hull	18–20	Castleford Tigers	1 April, 20:00 BST	Kingston Communications Stadium	Jamie Child	11,856
Leeds Rhinos	22–22	Wigan Warriors	1 April, 20:00 BST	Headingley Carnegie Stadium	Richard Silverwood	16,118
St. Helens	34–16	Hull Kingston Rovers	1 April, 20:00 BST	Stobart Stadium Halton	Ben Taylor	7,740
Salford City Reds	10–16	Crusaders	2 April, 19:15 BST	The Willows	Steven Ganson	3,416
Huddersfield Giants	34–10	Wakefield Trinity Wildcats	3 April, 15:00 BST	Galpharm Stadium	Robert Hicks	7,267
Warrington Wolves	20–22	Catalans Dragons	3 April, 15:00 BST	Halliwell Jones Stadium	Phil Bentham	10,056
Bradford Bulls	24–22	Harlequins RL	3 April, 15:00 BST	Odsal Stadium	Thierry Alibert	12,354

=== Round 9 ===
Home	Score	Away	Match Information
Home	Score	Away	Date and Time	Venue	Referee	Attendance
Hull	34–24	Bradford Bulls	8 April, 20:00 BST	Kingston Communications Stadium	Ben Thaler	11,346
Wigan Warriors	28–47	Catalans Dragons	8 April, 20:00 BST	DW Stadium	Jamie Child	13,134
Crusaders	18–34	St. Helens	8 April, 20:00 BST	Wrexham FC	Robert Hicks	4,002
Huddersfield Giants	29–10	Warrington Wolves	8 April, 20:00 BST	Galpharm Stadium	Richard Silverwood	7,224
Hull Kingston Rovers	38–28	Leeds Rhinos	9 April, 15:15 BST	Craven Park	Thierry Alibert	8,673
Castleford Tigers	52–20	Salford City Reds	10 April, 15:30 BST	The Jungle	Phil Bentham	6,741
Wakefield Trinity Wildcats	52–32	Harlequins RL	10 April, 15:30 BST	Belle Vue	Tim Roby	5,412

=== Round 10 ===
Home	Score	Away	Match Information
Home	Score	Away	Date and Time	Venue	Referee	Attendance
Harlequins RL	26–26	Castleford Tigers	15 April, 19:30 BST	Twickenham Stoop Stadium	Michael Thomason	4,128
Hull Kingston Rovers	16–28	Wigan Warriors	15 April, 20:00 BST	Craven Park	Thierry Alibert	8,703
Warrington Wolves	64–6	Crusaders	15 April, 20:00 BST	Halliwell Jones Stadium	Tim Roby	10,002
Leeds Rhinos	6–38	Huddersfield Giants	15 April, 20:00 BST	Headingley Carnegie Stadium	Ben Thaler	14,768
St. Helens	52–6	Wakefield Trinity Wildcats	15 April, 20:00 BST	Stobart Stadium Halton	Steven Ganson	7,003
Catalans Dragons	28–10	Hull	16 April, 18:30 BST	Stade Gilbert Brutus	Richard Silverwood	8,025
Salford City Reds	56–16	Bradford Bulls	16 April, 16:45 BST	The Willows	Jamie Child	2,809

=== Round 11 ===
Home	Score	Away	Match Information
Home	Score	Away	Date and Time	Venue	Referee	Attendance
Bradford Bulls	22–30	Leeds Rhinos	21 April, 20:00 BST	Odsal	Thierry Alibert	19,275
Hull	36–18	Hull Kingston Rovers	22 April, 12:15 BST	KC Stadium	Phil Bentham	19,754
Crusaders	32–6	Huddersfield Giants	22 April, 14:00 BST	Racecourse Ground	Steve Ganson	3,008
Harlequins RL	30–37	Catalans Dragons	22 April, 14:00 BST	Twickenham Stoop	Ben Thaler	2,069
Wigan Warriors	28–24	St. Helens	22 April, 14:45 BST	DW Stadium	Richard Silverwood	24,057
Salford City Reds	0–60	Warrington Wolves	22 April, 15:00 BST	The Willows	Robert Hicks	7,496
Castleford Tigers	24–28	Wakefield Trinity Wildcats	22 April, 19:30 BST	Probiz Coliseum	Jamie Child	9,020

=== Round 12 ===
Home	Score	Away	Match Information
Home	Score	Away	Date and Time	Venue	Referee	Attendance
Catalans Dragons	8–8	Bradford Bulls	25 April, 18:30 BST	Stade Gilbert Brutus	Steve Ganson	9,496
Hull Kingston Rovers	37–24	Harlequins RL	25 April, 14:30 BST	Craven Park	Richard Silverwood	7,139
Wakefield Trinity Wildcats	0–26	Wigan Warriors	25 April, 12:00 BST	Belle Vue	Robert Hicks	8,163
Warrington Wolves	10–24	Hull	25 April, 15:00 BST	Halliwell Jones Stadium	Ben Thaler	12,036
Leeds Rhinos	34–16	Crusaders	25 April, 15:00 BST	Headingley Carnegie Stadium	Jamie Child	14,165
St. Helens	22–20	Castleford Tigers	25 April, 15:00 BST	Stobart Stadium Halton	Phil Bentham	8,010
Huddersfield Giants	52–22	Salford City Reds	26 April, 19:00 BST	Galpharm Stadium	Thierry Alibert	6,042

=== Round 13 ===
Home	Score	Away	Match Information
Home	Score	Away	Date and Time	Venue	Referee	Attendance
Castleford Tigers	6–48	Leeds Rhinos	29 April, 17:15 BST	Probiz Coliseum	Richard Silverwood	9,860
Catalans Dragons	13–12	Huddersfield Giants	30 April, 18:30 BST	Stade Gilbert Brutus	Ben Thaler	7,825
Harlequins RL	16–34	Salford City Reds	30 April, 18:00 BST	Twickenham Stoop Stadium	Robert Hicks	1,957
Crusaders	16–48	Wigan Warriors	1 May, 15:00 BST	Wrexham FC	Jamie Child	5,037
Wakefield Trinity Wildcats	26–24	Hull Kingston Rovers	1 May, 15:30 BST	Belle Vue	Phil Bentham	7,283
Bradford Bulls	14–58	Warrington Wolves	1 May, 15:00 BST	Grattan Stadium	Thierry Alibert	14,134
Hull	24–24	St. Helens	2 May, 14:45 BST	Kingston Communications Stadium	Steve Ganson	11,933

=== Round 14 ===
Home	Score	Away	Match Information
Home	Score	Away	Date and Time	Venue	Referee	Attendance
Warrington Wolves	62–0	Castleford Tigers	13 May, 20:00 BST	Halliwell Jones Stadium	Steve Ganson	9,958
Crusaders	23–10	Wakefield Trinity Wildcats	13 May, 20:00 BST	Wrexham FC	Phil Bentham	3,241
Leeds Rhinos	30–6	Catalans Dragons	13 May, 20:00 BST	Headingley Carnegie Stadium	Robert Hicks	13,273
Salford City Reds	16–32	Hull	13 May, 20:00 BST	The Willows	Ben Thaler	3,983
Wigan Warriors	54–6	Harlequins RL	13 May, 20:00 BST	DW Stadium	Jamie Child	12,813
Huddersfield Giants	40–18	St. Helens	14 May, 17:00 BST	Galpharm Stadium	Thierry Alibert	7,843
Hull Kingston Rovers	46–18	Bradford Bulls	15 may, 15:00 BST	Craven Park	Richard Silverwood	7,923

=== Round 15 ===
Home	Score	Away	Match Information
Home	Score	Away	Date and Time	Venue	Referee	Attendance
Hull	20–34	Huddersfield Giants	27 May, 20:00 BST	Kingston Communications Stadium	Thierry Alibert	11,274
Leeds Rhinos	6–42	Warrington Wolves	27 May, 20:00 BST	Headingley Carnegie Stadium	Jamie Child	17,276
St. Helens	28–12	Crusaders	27 May, 20:00 BST	Stobart Stadium Halton	Ben Taylor	6,752
Castleford Tigers	56–24	Harlequins RL	29 May, 15:30 BST	The Probiz Coliseum	Robert Hicks	7,072
Wakefield Trinity Wildcats	22–42	Catalans Dragons	29 May, 15:30 BST	Belle Vue	Tim Roby	4,561
Bradford Bulls	28–14	Salford City Reds	29 May, 15:00 BST	Odsal Stadium	Richard Silverwood	12,487
Wigan Warriors	40–6	Hull Kingston Rovers	30 May, 18:30 BST	DW Stadium	Phil Bentham	14,779

=== Round 16 ===
Home	Score	Away	Match Information
Home	Score	Away	Date and Time	Venue	Referee	Attendance
Crusaders	16–56	Warrington Wolves	3 June, 20:00 BST	Wrexham FC	Robert Hicks	4,907
Salford City Reds	34–12	Wakefield Trinity Wildcats	3 June, 20:00 BST	The Willows	Jamie Child	3,213
St. Helens	42–16	Leeds Rhinos	3 June, 20:00 BST	Stobart Stadium Halton	Phil Bentham	9,062
Catalans Dragons	20–12	Wigan Warriors	4 June, 00:00 BST	Stade Gilbert Brutus	Richard Silverwood	9,372
Harlequins RL	16–30	Bradford Bulls	4 June, 15:00 BST	Twickenham Stoop Stadium	Thierry Alibert	4,253
Huddersfield Giants	40–18	Castleford Tigers	5 June, 17:45 BST	Shay Stadium	Ben Thaler	5,237
Hull Kingston Rovers	17–10	Hull	5 June, 15:00 BST	Craven Park	Steve Ganson	10,250

=== Round 17 ===
Home	Score	Away	Match Information
Home	Score	Away	Date and Time	Venue	Referee	Attendance
Catalans Dragons	31–18	Crusaders	11 June, 18:10 BST	Stade Gilbert Brutus	Steve Ganson	7,125
Castleford Tigers	22–22	Wigan Warriors	12 June, 15:30 BST	The Probiz Coliseum	Phil Bentham	7,263
Wakefield Trinity Wildcats	13–10	Huddersfield Giants	12 June, 15:30 BST	Belle Vue	Thierry Alibert	5,436
Warrington Wolves	16–18	Salford City Reds	12 June, 15:00 BST	Halliwell Jones Stadium	Ben Thaler	10,339
Hull	38–6	Harlequins RL	12 June, 15:00 BST	Kingston Communications Stadium	Richard Silverwood	11,139
Leeds Rhinos	44–14	Hull Kingston Rovers	12 June, 18:00 BST	Headingley Carnegie Stadium	Robert Hicks	13,669
Bradford Bulls	14–14	St. Helens	12 June, 17:45 BST	Odsal Stadium	Jamie Child	13,224

=== Round 18 ===
Home	Score	Away	Match Information
Home	Score	Away	Date and Time	Venue	Referee	Attendance
Crusaders	7–12	Leeds Rhinos	17 June, 20:00 BST	Wrexham FC	Ben Thaler	3,035
Salford City Reds	8–15	Castleford Tigers	17 June, 20:00 BST	The Willows	Phil Bentham	3,587
St. Helens	10–32	Wigan Warriors	17 June, 20:00 BST	Stobart Stadium Halton	Thierry Alibert	11,540
Harlequins RL	40–22	Wakefield Trinity Wildcats	18 June, 15:00 BST	Twickenham Stoop Stadium	Robert Hicks	2,875
Huddersfield Giants	28–20	Catalans Dragons	19 June, 15:00 BST	Shay Stadium	Richard Silverwood	5,132
Hull Kingston Rovers	16–46	Warrington Wolves	19 June, 15:00 BST	Craven Park	Steve Ganson	8,143
Bradford Bulls	14–28	Hull	19 June, 15:00 BST	Odsal Stadium	Phil Bentham	14,414

=== Round 19 ===
Home	Score	Away	Match Information
Home	Score	Away	Date and Time	Venue	Referee	Attendance
Crusaders	18–22	Salford City Reds	24 June, 20:00 BST	Wrexham FC	Robert Hicks	2,576
Leeds Rhinos	12–18	Bradford Bulls	24 June, 20:00 BST	Headingley Carnegie Stadium	Steve Ganson	18,095
Warrington Wolves	35–28	St. Helens	24 June, 20:00 BST	Halliwell Jones Stadium	Richard Silverwood	13,257
Wigan Warriors	46–12	Huddersfield Giants	24 June, 20:00 BST	DW Stadium	Phil Bentham	19,169
Catalans Dragons	54–20	Castleford Tigers	25 June, 18:30 BST	Stade Gilbert Brutus	Thierry Alibert	8,695
Harlequins RL	0–34	Hull Kingston Rovers	25 June, 15:00 BST	Twickenham Stoop Stadium	Ben Thaler	2,927
Wakefield Trinity Wildcats	18–52	Hull	26 June, 15:30 BST	The Rapid Solicitors Stadium	James Child	7,965

=== Round 20 ===
Home	Score	Away	Match Information
Home	Score	Away	Date and Time	Venue	Referee	Attendance
Salford City Reds	26–16	Harlequins RL	1 July, 20:00 BST	The Willows	Richard Silverwood	3,065
St. Helens	28–14	Hull	1 July, 20:00 BST	Stobart Stadium Halton	Ben Thaler	7,053
Wigan Warriors	26–24	Leeds Rhinos	1 July, 20:00 BST	DW Stadium	Thierry Alibert	16,426
Castleford Tigers	18–48	Warrington Wolves	1 July, 20:00 BST	The Probiz Coliseum	James Child	5,947
Huddersfield Giants	40–12	Crusaders	3 July, 15:00 BST	Shay Stadium	Steve Ganson	4,892
Hull Kingston Rovers	70–14	Wakefield Trinity Wildcats	3 July, 15:00 BST	Craven Park	Robert Hicks	8,025
Bradford Bulls	28–34	Catalans Dragons	2 July, 16:45 BST	Odsal Stadium	Phil Bentham	12,670

=== Round 21 ===
Home	Score	Away	Match Information
Home	Score	Away	Date and Time	Venue	Referee	Attendance
Hull	52–16	Salford City Reds	8 July, 20:00 BST	Kingston Communications Stadium	Phil Bentham	11,699
Crusaders	10–38	Hull Kingston Rovers	9 July, 15:00 BST	Racecourse Ground	Thierry Alibert	2,820
Harlequins RL	6–38	Wigan Warriors	9 July, 15:00 BST	Twickenham Stoop Stadium	Robert Hicks	4,423
Catalans Dragons	38–18	Leeds Rhinos	10 July, 17:45 BST	Stade Gilbert Brutus	James Child	10,688
Castleford Tigers	34–30	Bradford Bulls	10 July, 15:30 BST	The Probiz Coliseum	Richard Silverwood	7,004
Wakefield Trinity Wildcats	6–46	St. Helens	10 July, 15:30 BST	The Rapid Solicitors Stadium	Steve Ganson	5,985
Warrington Wolves	28–16	Huddersfield Giants	8 July, 20:00 BST	Halliwell Jones Stadium	Ben Thaler	10,283

=== Round 22 ===
Home	Score	Away	Match Information
Home	Score	Away	Date and Time	Venue	Referee	Attendance
Crusaders	20–26	Castleford Tigers	15 July, 20:00 BST	Racecourse Ground	Ben Thaler	3,055
Leeds Rhinos	20–0	Hull	15 July, 20:00 BST	Headingley Carnegie Stadium	Richard Silverwood	14,809
St. Helens	40–18	Catalans Dragons	15 July, 20:00 BST	Stobart Stadium Halton	Phil Bentham	7,076
Wigan Warriors	48–6	Wakefield Trinity Wildcats	15 July, 20:00 BST	DW Stadium	Thierry Alibert	13,095
Harlequins RL	24–54	Warrington Wolves	16 July, 15:00 BST	Twickenham Stoop Stadium	Steve Ganson	3,842
Hull Kingston Rovers	21–8	Salford City Reds	17 July, 15:00 BST	Craven Park	Tim Roby	7,834
Bradford Bulls	36–0	Huddersfield Giants	17 July, 15:00 BST	Odsal Stadium	James Child	14,047

=== Round 23 ===
Home	Score	Away	Match Information
Home	Score	Away	Date and Time	Venue	Referee	Attendance
Hull	16–30	Wigan Warriors	29 July, 20:00 BST	Kingston Communications Stadium	Ben Thaler	11,729
Salford City Reds	22–30	Leeds Rhinos	29 July, 20:00 BST	The Willows	Richard Silverwood	4,024
Catalans Dragons	48–22	Harlequins RL	30 July, 18:30 BST	Stade Gilbert Brutus	John Child	8,471
Castleford Tigers	26–46	St. Helens	31 July, 15:30 BST	The Probiz Coliseum	Rcihard Hicks	6,802
Huddersfield Giants	46–26	Hull Kingston Rovers	31 July, 15:00 BST	Galpharm Stadium	Thierry Albert	6,464
Wakefield Trinity Wildcats	6–40	Crusaders	31 July, 15:30 BST	The Rapid Solicitors Stadium	Phil Bentham	6,428
Warrington Wolves	64–6	Bradford Bulls	31 July, 15:00 BST	Halliwell Jones Stadium	Steve Ganson	10,641

=== Round 24 ===
Home	Score	Away	Match Information
Home	Score	Away	Date and Time	Venue	Referee	Attendance
Crusaders	31–12	Harlequins RL	12 August, 20:00 BST	Racecourse Ground		2,259
Hull	40–8	Catalans Dragons	12 August, 20:00 BST	Kingston Communications Stadium		10,739
Leeds Rhinos	56–0	Castleford Tigers	12 August, 20:00 BST	Headingley Carnegie Stadium		15,156
St. Helens	19–6	Huddersfield Giants	12 August, 20:00 BST	Stobart Stadium Halton		6,421
Wigan Warriors	52–18	Salford City Reds	12 August, 20:00 BST	DW Stadium		13,607
Warrington Wolves	66–12	Wakefield Trinity Wildcats	14 August, 15:00 BST	Halliwell Jones Stadium		10,296
Bradford Bulls	8–34	Hull Kingston Rovers	14 August, 15:00 BST	Odsal Stadium		13,441

=== Round 25 ===
Home	Score	Away	Match Information
Home	Score	Away	Date and Time	Venue	Referee	Attendance
Crusaders	18–58	Hull	19 August, 20:00 BST	Racecourse Ground	TBC	3,827
Salford City Reds	24–18	Huddersfield Giants	19 August, 20:00 BST	The Willows	TBC	3,458
Wigan Warriors	60–12	Bradford Bulls	19 August, 20:00 BST	DW Stadium	TBC	13,940
Catalans Dragons	12–25	Warrington Wolves	20 August, 18:30 BST	Stade Gilbert Brutus	TBC	9,495
Harlequins RL	32–22	Leeds Rhinos	20 August, 15:00 BST	Twickenham Stoop Stadium	TBC	3,241
Hull Kingston Rovers	24–22	St. Helens	21 August, 15:00 BST	New Craven Park	TBC	8,356
Wakefield Trinity Wildcats	30–34	Castleford Tigers	21 August, 15:30 BST	Rapid Solicitors Stadium	TBC	6,784

=== Round 26 ===
Home	Score	Away	Match Information
Home	Score	Away	Date and Time	Venue	Referee	Attendance
Leeds Rhinos	64–20	Wakefield Trinity Wildcats	2 September, 20:00 BST	Headingley Carnegie Stadium	Ben Thaler	15.511
St. Helens	31–6	Salford City Reds	2 September, 20:00 BST	Stobart Stadium Halton	Phil Bentham	7,377
Catalans Dragons	28–30	Hull Kingston Rovers	3 September, 18:30 BST	Stade Gilbert Brutus	Jamie Child	8,252
Castleford Tigers	18–50	Hull	4 September, 15:30 BST	The Jungle	Steve Ganson	7,866
Huddersfield Giants	50–12	Harlequins RL	4 September, 15:00 BST	Galpharm Stadium	Thierry Albert	5,220
Warrington Wolves	39–12	Wigan Warriors	4 September, 15:00 BST	Halliwell Jones Stadium	Richard Sliverwood	13,024
Bradford Bulls	48–24	Crusaders	4 September, 15:00 BST	Odsal Stadium	Robert Hicks	12,998

=== Round 27 ===
Home	Score	Away	Match Information
Home	Score	Away	Date and Time	Venue	Referee	Attendance
Hull	12–34	Warrington Wolves	9 September, 20:00 BST	Kingston Communications Stadium		10,845
Wigan Warriors	42–10	Crusaders	9 September, 20:00 BST	DW Stadium		19,104
Harlequins RL	16–34	St. Helens	10 September, 15:00 BST	Twickenham Stoop Stadium		3,546
Huddersfield Giants	24–31	Leeds Rhinos	11 September, 15:00 BST	Galpharm Stadium		10,428
Hull Kingston Rovers	26–24	Castleford Tigers	11 September, 15:00 BST	Craven Park		8,936
Salford City Reds	18–44	Catalans Dragons	11 September, 15:00 BST	The Willows		10,146
Wakefield Trinity Wildcats	26–14	Bradford Bulls	11 September, 15:30 BST	Rapid Solicitors Stadium		6,486

== Notes ==
A. All round 1 matches played at Millennium Stadium, as part of Magic Weekend
B. All St Helens home games in 2011 to be played at Halton Stadium
C. Game to be rescheduled for later date, due to Wigan's involvement in the 2011 World Club Challenge

== See also ==
- Super League XVI
- Super League play-offs
