= Jonny Walker (rugby league) =

English rugby league footballer

Personal information
- Born: 26 March 1988 (age 38) Preston, Lancashire, England
- Height: 187 cm (6 ft 2 in)
- Weight: 83 kg (13 st 1 lb)

Playing information
- Position: Second-row
Club
| Years | Team | Pld | T | G | FG | P |
|---|---|---|---|---|---|---|
| 2010 | Wigan Warriors | 1 | 0 | 0 | 0 | 0 |
| 2010(DR) | → Blackpool Panthers | 5 | 0 | 0 | 0 | 0 |
| 2011 | Barrow Raiders |
| 2012 | Batley Bulldogs | 12 | 1 | 0 | 0 | 4 |
| | Total | 18 | 1 | 0 | 0 | 4 |

Jonny Walker (born 26 March 1988 in Preston, Lancashire) is an English former professional rugby league footballer who played for the Wigan Warriors in the Super League competition, the Blackpool Panthers and the Batley Bulldogs, as a second-row.

== Club career ==
Walker started the 2010 season on a dual registration loan from Wigan Warriors to Blackpool Panthers, but only made one appearance for them before being recalled by Wigan Warriors to make his début in the home defeat by Harlequins. He made no further appearances for Wigan, and joined Barrow Raiders in 2011 on another dual registration deal. He signed for Batley Bulldogs in 2012.

Walker was forced to retire after failing to recover from a series of head injuries suffered during his first season at Batley.
