= 2005 Rugby League National Leagues =

2005 National Leagues
- League: National Leagues

National League One
- Champions: Castleford Tigers
- League leaders: Whitehaven

Promotion and relegation
- Promoted from National League One: Castleford Tigers
- Relegated to National League Two: Barrow Raiders; Featherstone Rovers

National League Two

Promotion and relegation
- Promoted from National League Two: York City Knights

National League Three
- Champions: Coventry Bears
- League leaders: Bradford Dudley Hill

The 2005 National Leagues (known as the LHF Healthplan National Leagues due to sponsorship) were the second, third and fourth divisions of rugby league in the UK.

== National League One ==
=== Table ===
Pos	Team	Pld	W	D	L	PF	PA	PD	Pts	Qualification
1	Whitehaven	18	16	0	2	648	307	+341	32	Semi-final
2	Castleford Tigers (P)	18	15	0	3	683	368	+315	30	Semi-final
3	Hull Kingston Rovers	18	13	0	5	589	389	+200	26	Elimination Semi-final
4	Halifax	18	10	0	8	604	467	+137	20	Elimination Semi-final
5	Doncaster	18	10	0	8	485	470	+15	20	Elimination Semi-final
6	Rochdale Hornets	18	9	1	8	468	506	−38	19	Elimination Semi-final
7	Oldham	18	6	1	11	455	545	−90	13	
8	Batley Bulldogs	18	5	0	13	417	574	−157	10	Qualification for National League Two Playoff Final
9	Featherstone Rovers (R)	18	3	2	13	454	648	−194	8	Relegated to National League Two
10	Barrow Raiders (R)	18	1	0	17	303	832	−529	2	Relegated to National League Two

Rules for classification: 1) Points; 2) Points difference; 3) Number of points scored;
(P) Promoted; (R) Relegated

=== Play-offs ===
Elimination play-offs
The Shay
3	Halifax	64
6	Doncaster	10
Craven Park
4	Hull KR	45
5	Rochdale	4

Qualifying/Elimination semifinal
Leigh Sports Village
1	Whitehaven	32
2	Castleford	22
The Shay
Halifax	36
Hull KR	22

Elimination final
Wheldon Road
Castleford	15
Halifax	12

Grand Final
Castleford	36
Whitehaven	8

==== Grand Final ====
9 October 2005

Castleford Tigers	36 – 8	Whitehaven
Tries: Davis (2), Blanch, Haughey, Crouch, Huby; Goals: Huby (3), Fletcher (2), Hepworth		Tries: Calvert, Seeds

Halton Stadium, Widnes
Attendance: 13,300
Referee: Steve Ganson

== National League Two ==
=== Table ===
Pos	Team	Pld	W	D	L	PF	PA	PD	Pts	Qualification
1	York City Knights (P)	18	15	0	3	683	356	+327	30	Promoted to National League One
2	Dewsbury Rams	18	13	1	4	526	350	+176	27	Semi-final
3	Workington Town	18	13	1	4	507	442	+65	27	Elimination Final
4	Swinton Lions	18	11	0	7	623	434	+189	22	Elimination Final
5	Hunslet Hawks	18	11	0	7	476	385	+91	22	Elimination Final
6	Gateshead Thunder	18	8	1	9	516	508	+8	17	Elimination Final
7	Sheffield Eagles	18	8	0	10	414	529	−115	16	
8	Keighley Cougars	18	4	1	13	359	471	−112	9	
9	Blackpool Panthers	18	3	0	15	356	623	−267	6	
10	London Skolars	18	2	0	16	258	620	−362	4	

Rules for classification: 1) Points; 2) Points difference; 3) Number of points scored;
(P) Promoted

=== Play-offs ===
Quarterfinals
L2:3	Workington Town	47
L2:6	Gateshead Thunder	12
L2:4	Swinton Lions	40
L2:5	Hunslet Hawks	28

Qualifying/Elimination semifinal
L1:8	Batley Bulldogs	40
L2:2	Dewsbury Rams	20
Workington Town	17
Swinton Lions	16

Preliminary final
Dewsbury Rams	26
Workington Town	18

Grand Final
Batley Bulldogs	28
Dewsbury Rams	26

==== Grand Final ====
9 October 2005

Batley Bulldogs	28 – 26	Dewsbury Rams
Tries: Eaton, Gallagher, Jones, Marsh, Sibson; Goals: Eaton (4)		Tries: Crouthers, Hall, Rogers, Sheridan; Goals: Maloney (5)

Halton Stadium, Widnes
Referee: Ben Thaler

== National League Three ==
=== Table ===
Position	Club	Played	Won	Drawn	Lost	Pts for	Pts agst	Points
1	Bradford Dudley Hill	18	17	0	1	840	253	34
2	Bramley Buffaloes	18	16	0	2	832	237	32
3	St Albans Centurions	18	14	0	4	770	349	28
4	Warrington Wizards	18	10	1	7	683	382	21
5	Sheffield Hillsborough Hawks	18	9	1	8	444	514	19
6	Hemel Stags	18	8	0	10	409	523	16
7	Coventry Bears	18	7	0	11	525	635	14
8	Huddersfield Underbank Rangers	18	5	0	13	466	679	10
9	Gateshead Storm	18	3	0	15	359	765	6
10	Essex Eels	18	0	0	18	181	1194	0

=== Play-offs ===
==== Week 1 ====
St Albans Centurions 40-6 Hemel Stags

Warrington Wizards 48-12 Sheffield Hillsborough Hawks

==== Week 2 ====
Bradford Dudley Hill 18-19 Bramley Buffaloes

St Albans Centurions 46–24 Warrington Wizards

==== Week 3 ====
Bradford Dudley Hill 63-10 St Albans Centurions

==== Grand Final ====
Bradford Dudley Hill 28-26 Bramley Buffaloes
