= 2003 Rugby League National Leagues =

2003 National Leagues
- League: National League

National League One
- Champions: Salford City Reds
- League leaders: Salford City Reds

Promotion and relegation
- Promoted from National League One: Salford City Reds
- Relegated to National League Two: Dewsbury Rams

National League Two
- Champions: Keighley Cougars
- League leaders: Sheffield Eagles

Promotion and relegation
- Promoted from National League Two: Keighley Cougars

National League Three
- Champions: Woolston Rovers
- League leaders: Bradford Dudley Hill

The 2003 National Leagues (known as the LHF National Leagues due to sponsorship) are the second, third and fourth divisions of rugby league played in Britain.

National Leagues One and Two were made up of the 18 clubs that competed in the Northern Ford Premiership during the previous season, plus the London Skolars and the York City Knights. At the end of the season, the team finishing bottom of League One was automatically relegated, to be replace by the League Two Grand Final winners. The losing finalist entered into play-offs with the teams finishing eighth and ninth in League One.

National League Three consisted of ten additional teams from the amateur leagues. There was no automatic promotion and relegation to or from National League Three.

== National League One ==
National League One was won by Salford City Reds, and won promotion to the Super League after defeating runners-up the Leigh Centurions in the play-off final. The Dewsbury Rams were relegated to National Two.

Pos	Team	Pld	W	D	L	PF	PA	PD	Pts	Qualification
1	Salford City Reds (P)	18	14	2	2	732	294	+438	30	Semi-final
2	Leigh Centurions	18	15	0	3	702	309	+393	30	Semi-final
3	Rochdale Hornets	18	13	0	5	647	477	+170	26	Elimination Semi-final
4	Hull Kingston Rovers	18	10	0	8	401	373	+28	20	Elimination Semi-final
5	Oldham	18	7	2	9	404	500	−96	16	Elimination Semi-final
6	Whitehaven	18	5	5	8	443	438	+5	15	Elimination Semi-final
7	Featherstone Rovers	18	7	0	11	387	478	−91	14	
8	Doncaster Dragons	18	6	1	11	429	632	−203	13	Relegation/Promotion play-offs
9	Batley Bulldogs	18	5	1	12	366	543	−177	11	Relegation/Promotion play-offs
10	Dewsbury Rams (R)	18	2	1	15	284	751	−467	5	Relegated to National League Two

Source: Rugby League Project
Rules for classification: 1) Points; 2) Points difference; 3) Number of points scored;
(P) Promoted; (R) Relegated

=== Playoffs ===
Elimination play-offs
Spotland
3	Rochdale	40
6	Whitehaven	38
Craven Park
4	Hull KR	38
5	Oldham	24

Qualifying/Elimination semifinal
The Willows
1	Salford	26
2	Leigh Centurions	18
Spotland
Rochdale	26
Hull KR	30

Elimination final
Leigh Sports Village
Leigh Centurions	42
Hull KR	12

Grand Final
Halton Stadium
Salford	31
Leigh Centurions	14

==== Grand Final ====
5 October 2003

Salford City Reds	31 – 14	Leigh Centurions
Tries: Hunte (2), Beverley, Littler; Goals: Charles (6), Blakeley; Drop goals: Blakeley		Tries: Richardson, Halliwell, Swann; Goals: Turley

Halton Stadium, Widnes
Attendance: 9,186
Referee: Richard Silverwood

== National League Two ==
National League Two was won by the Sheffield Eagles, but lost to the Keighley Cougars in the play-off final.

Pos	Team	Pld	W	D	L	PF	PA	PD	Pts	Qualification
1	Sheffield Eagles	18	13	0	5	644	326	+318	26	Semi-final
2	Chorley Lynx	18	13	0	5	584	362	+222	26	Semi-final
3	Keighley Cougars (P)	18	13	0	5	488	340	+148	26	Elimination Semi-final
4	York City Knights	18	11	1	6	576	381	+195	23	Elimination Semi-final
5	Barrow Raiders	18	11	0	7	546	419	+127	22	Elimination Semi-final
6	Hunslet Hawks	18	10	1	7	513	425	+88	21	Elimination Semi-final
7	Swinton Lions	18	8	1	9	445	426	+19	17	
8	Workington Town	18	4	1	13	393	558	−165	9	
9	Gateshead Thunder	18	3	1	14	365	663	−298	7	
10	London Skolars	18	1	1	16	222	876	−654	3	

Source: Rugby League Project
Rules for classification: 1) Points; 2) Points difference; 3) Number of points scored;
(P) Promoted

=== Playoffs ===
Elimination play-offs
Cougar Park
3	Keighley	25
6	Hunslet	12
Bootham Crescent
4	York	30
5	Barrow	50

Qualifying/Elimination semifinal
Don Valley Stadium
1	Sheffield	31
2	Chorley	14
Cougar Park
Keighley	35
Barrow	26

Elimination final
Bloomfield Road
Chorley	12
Keighley	45

Grand Final
Halton Stadium
Keighley	13
Sheffield	11

==== Grand Final ====
5 October 2003

Keighley Cougars	13 – 11	Sheffield Eagles
Tries: M. Foster, Robinson; Goals: Ashton (2); Drop goals: Firth		Tries: O'Reilly; Goals: G. Brown (3); Drop goals: Reilly

Halton Stadium, Widnes
Attendance: 9,186
Referee: Peter Taberner

== Promotion/Relegation playoffs ==
semi-final
L1:8	Doncaster Dragons	45
L1:9	Batley Bulldogs	12

Final
Batley Bulldogs	36
L2:1	Sheffield	14

== National League Three ==
National League Three was won by Bradford Dudley Hill, with the play-offs being won by the Woolston Rovers (Warrington).

=== Table ===
Pos	Club	Pld	W	D	L	Pts for	Pts agst	Pts	Qualification
1	Bradford Dudley Hill	14	13	0	1	545	178	26	Qualifying Semi Final
2	Teesside Steelers	14	10	1	3	343	273	21	Qualifying Semi Final
3	Woolston Rovers (Warrington)	14	9	1	4	480	244	19	Elimination Play-off
4	St Albans Centurions	14	9	0	5	410	284	18	Elimination Play-off
5	Sheffield Hillsborough Hawks	14	7	1	6	395	246	15	Elimination Play-off
6	Underbank Rangers	14	7	0	7	412	396	14	Elimination Play-off
7	South London Storm	14	6	0	8	274	362	12	
8	Coventry Bears	14	4	1	9	273	385	9	
9	Manchester Knights	14	3	0	11	228	584	6	
10	Hemel Stags	14	0	0	14	160	568	0	

=== Playoffs ===
Elimination play-offs
3	Woolston Rovers (Warrington)	18
6	Underbank Rangers	10
4	St Albans Centurions	20
5	Sheffield Hillsborough Hawks	8

Qualifying/Elimination semifinal
1	Bradford Dudley Hill	8
2	Teesside Steelers	10
Woolston Rovers (Warrington)	24
St Albans Centurions	10

Elimination final
Bradford Dudley Hill	12
Woolston Rovers (Warrington)	34

Grand Final
Halton Stadium
Woolston Rovers (Warrington)	42
Teesside Steelers	6
