= 2004 Rugby League National Leagues =

2004 National Leagues
- League: National Leagues

National League One
- Champions: Leigh Centurions
- League leaders: Leigh Centurions

Promotion and relegation
- Promoted from National League One: Leigh Centurions
- Relegated to National League Two: Keighley Cougars

National League Two
- Champions: Barrow Raiders

Promotion and relegation
- Promoted from National League Two: Barrow Raiders

National League Three
- Champions: Coventry Bears
- League leaders: Coventry Bears

The 2004 National Leagues (known as the LHF Healthplan National Leagues due to sponsorship) are the second, third and fourth divisions of rugby league in the UK.

== National League One ==
National League One was won by Leigh Centurions, and won promotion to the Super League after defeating runners-up Whitehaven in the play-off final. Keighley Cougars were relegated to National League Two.

=== Table ===
Pos	Team	Pld	W	D	L	PF	PA	PD	Pts	Qualification
1	Leigh Centurions (P)	18	14	0	4	686	407	+279	28	Semi-final
2	Whitehaven	18	14	0	4	552	312	+240	28	Semi-final
3	Hull Kingston Rovers	18	10	0	8	466	428	+38	20	Elimination Semi-final
4	Oldham	18	10	0	8	482	503	−21	20	Elimination Semi-final
5	Featherstone Rovers	18	9	1	8	500	491	+9	19	Elimination Semi-final
6	Doncaster Dragons	18	9	0	9	503	534	−31	18	Elimination Semi-final
7	Batley Bulldogs	18	8	0	10	478	469	+9	16	
8	Rochdale Hornets	18	7	1	10	472	587	−115	15	
9	Halifax	18	7	0	11	426	492	−66	14	Qualification for National League Two Playoff Final
10	Keighley Cougars (R)	18	1	0	17	366	708	−342	2	Relegated to National League Two

Rules for classification: 1) Points; 2) Points difference; 3) Number of points scored;
(P) Promoted; (R) Relegated

=== Play-offs ===
Elimination play-offs
Craven Park
3	Hull KR	63
6	Doncaster	22
Whitebank
4	Oldham	28
5	Featherstone	33

Qualifying/Elimination semifinal
Leigh Sports Village
1	Leigh	30
2	Whitehaven	16
Craven Park
Hull KR	18
Featherstone	19

Elimination final
Recreation Ground
Whitehaven	30
Featherstone	2

Grand Final2
Leigh	32
Whitehaven	16

==== Grand Final ====
10 October 2004

Leigh Centurions	32 – 16	Whitehaven
Tries: Cooper (2), Turley, Martyn; Goals: Turley (6); Drop goals: Turley (2), Martyn, Rowley		Tries: Wilson (2), Calvert; Goals: Nanyn (2)

Halton Stadium, Widnes
Attendance: 11,005
Referee: Ronnie Laughton (Barnsley)

== National League Two ==
National League Two was won by Barrow Raiders, and were automatically promoted to National League One. York City Knights reached the play-off final, but lost to Halifax, who retained their National League One status.

=== Table ===
Pos	Team	Pld	W	D	L	PF	PA	PD	Pts	Qualification
1	Barrow Raiders (P)	18	14	1	3	521	346	+175	29	Promoted to National League One
2	York City Knights	18	13	0	5	630	308	+322	26	Semi-final
3	Sheffield Eagles	18	12	0	6	569	340	+229	24	Elimination Semi-final
4	Swinton Lions	18	12	0	6	547	460	+87	24	Elimination Semi-final
5	Workington Town	18	10	0	8	597	479	+118	20	Elimination Semi-final
6	Hunslet Hawks	18	10	0	8	475	394	+81	20	Elimination Semi-final
7	Chorley Lynx	18	7	2	9	460	522	−62	16	
8	London Skolars	18	6	0	12	361	583	−222	12	
9	Dewsbury Rams	18	3	1	14	284	595	−311	7	
10	Gateshead Thunder	18	1	0	17	298	715	−417	2	

Rules for classification: 1) Points; 2) Points difference; 3) Number of points scored;
(P) Promoted

=== Play-offs ===
Quarterfinals
L2:3	Sheffield Eagles	16
L2:6	Hunslet Hawks	39
L2:4	Swinton Lions	38
L2:5	Workington Town	48

Qualifying/Elimination semifinal
L1:9	Halifax	37
L2:2	York City Knights	20
Workington Town	27
Hunslet Hawks	13

Preliminary final
York City Knights	70
Workington Town	10

Grand Final
Halifax	34
York City Knights	30

==== Grand Final ====
10 October 2004

Halifax	34 – 30	York City Knights
Tries: Bunyan (2), Hadcroft (2), Scott Grix, Sheriffe; Goals: Bloem (5)		Tries: Buchanan (2), Cain, Elston, Langley; Goals: Brough (5)

Halton Stadium, Widnes
Referee: Robert Connolly

== National League Three ==
National League Three expanded to a 14-team league, but there was still no automatic promotion and relegation with National League Two. The league was won by Coventry Bears, who also went on to win the play-offs.

=== Table ===
Pos	Club	Pld	W	D	L	Pts for	Pts agst	Pts	Qualification
1	Coventry Bears	20	17	0	3	831	385	34	Play-offs
2	Bradford Dudley Hill	20	16	0	4	942	317	32	Play-offs
3	Woolston Rovers (Warrington)	20	15	1	4	764	232	31	Play-offs
4	Sheffield Hillsborough Hawks	20	13	1	6	631	334	27	Play-offs
5	Bramley Buffaloes	20	13	1	6	592	368	27	Play-offs
6	Hemel Stags	20	13	0	7	721	424	26	Play-offs
7	St Albans Centurions	20	13	0	7	724	406	26	Play-offs
8	Birmingham Bulldogs	20	10	0	10	620	624	20	Play-offs
9	Underbank Rangers	20	9	1	10	671	519	19	
10	South London Storm	20	8	2	10	496	510	18	
11	Manchester Knights	20	5	0	15	467	625	10	
12	Carlisle Centurions	20	3	0	17	290	498	6	
13	Gateshead Storm	20	2	0	18	290	1041	4	
14	Essex Eels	20	1	0	19	186	1492	2	

=== Play-offs ===
==== Week 1 ====
Bradford Dudley Hill 13–30 St Albans Centurions

Coventry Bears 32–26 Birmingham Bulldogs

Sheffield Hillsborough Hawks 38–6 Bramley Buffaloes

Woolston Rovers (Warrington) 36–32 Hemel Stags

==== Week 2 ====
Sheffield Hillsborough Hawks 26–40 Bradford Dudley Hill

St Albans Centurions 18–26 Bramley Buffaloes

==== Week 3 ====
Coventry Bears 32–18 Bramley Buffaloes

Woolston Rovers (Warrington) 32–18 Bradford Dudley Hill

=== Grand Final ===
Coventry Bears 48–24 Woolston Rovers (Warrington)
