= Wigan Riversiders =

English amateur rugby league club

- Coat of arms

Club information
- Full name: Wigan Riversiders RLC
- Colours: Red and white
- Founded: 2002; 23 years ago
- Website: www.riversiders.rlfans.com

Current details
- Ground(s): Wigan St Judes, Keats Ave, Parsons Meadow, Poolstock, Wigan, WN3 5UB
- Competition: Rugby League Conference North West Premier

Wigan Riversiders are a rugby league team based in Wigan, Greater Manchester, England. The first team play in the North West Premier division of the Rugby League Conference; the second team play in the North West regional division under the name Wigan Riversiders Eels; and the third play in the North West Merit League.

== History ==
Wigan Riversiders joined the RL Merit League for the 2008 season. They finished third in the table and beat Nottingham Outlaws A 48–4 to reach the grand final, where they were beaten by Moorends-Thorne Maurauders A.

Wigan Riversiders joined the Rugby League Conference in 2009 joining the North West Premier division. Riversiders formed an A-team, known as Wigan Riversiders Eels, who took part in the North West pool of the RL Merit League. They reached the final of the North West pool but lost to Huyton Bulldogs.

In 2010, Riversiders fielded one team in the North West Premier with their second team, the Eels, joining the RLC North West regional division and a new third team to take part in the RL Merit League.

2011 sees the Riversiders again enter two teams into the summer leagues, the first team will continue to challenge in the North West Premier, the second team have been entered into the Merit League for 2011. Along with many changes at the club, the Riversiders appointed two new coaches at the club.
