= Ormskirk Heelers =

English amateur rugby league club

Ormskirk Heelers ARLFC
Club information
- Full name: Ormskirk Heelers ARLFC
- Founded: 2005; 21 years ago

Current details
- Ground: Green Road, Ormskirk

Ormskirk Heelers are an amateur rugby league club from Ormskirk in Lancashire. They play at Green Road, which is also the home of Ormskirk rugby union side. In 2006, Southport Storm merged with the Heelers, but there were no name changes on Ormskirks part. This allowed the club to pull in players from a bigger catchment area.

In the past few years the club has been in various divisions of the Rugby League Conference, including playing against teams from Cheshire, Merseyside and Lancashire. They currently play in the RLC North West division, after the merging of the Cheshire and the North West divisions.

== Seasons ==
In 2005 whilst playing in the RLC North West Division the Heelers finished 8th on 6 points, winning three of their nine matches.

But in 2006 there was a change in head coach, Dave Archer coming in to try and steer the club to the top of a new challenge in the RLC Cheshire Division. And he had seemed to have done the job with the team losing just two of their ten matches. Despite finishing 2nd though, in the playoffs they didn't do as well ending up 4th after losing both games.

After the merging of the two divisions they had previous participated in, the club were once again playing in the RLC North West division in 2007. The season was a disaster with the Heelers unable to field a side for six of their games, thus finishing bottom place, 12th, losing all their 12 games. In the whole season they had scored just 72 points whilst conceding 354 points. It is still unsure whether Ormskirk Heelers will be playing in 2008.

== Results ==
These are the results from the 2007 season:

- Liverpool Buccaneers 22-12 Ormskirk Heelers
- Ormskirk Heelers 12-20 Widnes Saints
- Blackpool Sea Eagles 52-22 Ormskirk Heelers
- Ormskirk Heelers 0-24 Warrington Wizards
- Ormskirk Heelers 0-24 Macclesfield Titans
- Ormskirk Heelers 0-24 Runcorn RLC
- Ormskirk Heelers 14-32 Liverpool Buccaneers
- Widnes Saints 50-14 Ormskirk Heelers
- Ormskirk Heelers 0-24 Blackpool Sea Eagles
- Warrington Wizards 0-24 Ormskirk Heelers
- Runcorn RLC 24-0 Ormskirk Heelers

== Visit To America ==
In 2006 head coach Mike Featherstone got the team playing a 9 a side match on the North Avenue Beach at Chicago. They played newly formed team the Chicago Saints, who were hoping to get access into the AMNRL in 2007. The match finished a 20-20 draw, both sides scoring 5 tries each.
