= Harry Jepson Trophy =

- Sport: Rugby league
- Inaugural season: 1997
- Country: England
- Champions: Telford Raiders (2026)
- Most titles: South West London Chargers (3)
- Related competition: Rugby League Conference, London and South East Rugby League, Midlands Rugby League

The Harry Jepson Trophy is a rugby league competition contested by teams from successor leagues to the Rugby League Conference. It is named after Harry Jepson.

== History ==
The Harry Jepson trophy was first contested in 1997 by members of the then Southern Conference. The conference was renamed the Rugby League Conference in 1998 and it began to expand from its initial base in the South of England and the Midlands. The winners of the various regional divisions would enter a play-off system culminating in a Grand Final for the trophy.

In 2005, the Conference changed structure with the formation of Premier Divisions for the stronger teams, the Harry Jepson trophy was then competed for by the winners of the Premier divisions with the regional division winners playing-off for the RLC Regional trophy.

In 2012, the national Conference was replaced by locally administered regional leagues but the Harry Jepson trophy continued to be contested by teams in some of these new regional leagues.

In 2023, the trophy was given a new lease of life by becoming an end of season competition between the winners of the London and South East Rugby League & Midlands Rugby League with a final on the same day as the Southern Conference League final.

== 2012 structure ==
The winners of the Scottish Conference League Premier Division, the North East Rugby League Premier Division, the Midlands Rugby League Premier Division, the London & South East Men's League, the West of England, the South Premier and the East Rugby League played-off in a knock-out tournament that ended in a Grand Final.

== Past winners ==
- 1997 North London Skolars
- 1998 Crawley Jets
- 1999 Chester Wolves
- 2000 Crawley Jets
- 2001 Teesside Steelers
- 2002 Coventry Bears
- 2003 Bridgend Blue Bulls
- 2004 Widnes Saints
- 2005 Bridgend Blue Bulls
- 2006 South London Storm
- 2007 St Albans Centurions
- 2008 Nottingham Outlaws
- 2009 West London Sharks
- 2010 St Albans Centurions
- 2011 Parkside Hawks
- 2012 London Skolars A
- 2013 South West London Chargers
- 2014 South West London Chargers
- 2015 South West London Chargers
- 2016 Wests Warriors
- 2017 London & South East (Played as a regional representative competition)
- 2018 All Golds
- 2019–2022 No Competition
- 2023 Medway Dragons
- 2024 Telford Raiders
- 2025 Medway Dragons
- 2026 Telford Raiders

== See also ==
- British rugby league system
