= Rugby League Conference National Division =

- Sport: Rugby league
- Formerly known as: National League Three
- Instituted: 2003
- Inaugural season: 2003
- Ceased: 2011
- Replaced by: National Conference League Division Three
- Number of teams: 10
- Countries: England; Wales
- Most titles: Bramley Buffaloes (2 titles)

The Rugby League Conference National Division (formerly known as the National League Three) was the fourth division of the British rugby league system.

In 2012, the winter amateur competition, the National Conference League announced it was switching to a summer season and the Rugby League Conference would become part of the NCL.

== History ==
=== 2003-2006: National League Three ===
Leading up to the 2003 season the RFL rebranded its lower divisions as the National Leagues and reintroduced a third division, National League Two.

The RFL also planned for two more divisions to be added, a National League Three and National League Four. National League Three would be made up of British Amateur Rugby League Association (BARLA) teams wishing to play in the summer whilst National League Four would have been made up of clubs from the Rugby League Conference. Promotion and relegation between National League Three and the semi-professional National League Two would have been gradually introduced. However, due to an insufficient number of applicants, National League Four was never founded.

In the end, a ten team National League Three was founded, with six coming from the Rugby League Conference (Teesside Steelers, Manchester Knights, Coventry Bears, Hemel Stags, St Albans Centurions and South London Storm, four from the National Conference League (Bradford Dudley Hill, Sheffield Hillsborough Hawks and Warrington Woolston Rovers) and Huddersfield Underbank Rangers from the Pennine League). The league was split into two regions with sides playing everyone in their region twice and those outside once except for one cross-region team they played twice giving 14 fixtures with no promotion to National League Two.

The 2004 season saw an expansion to fourteen teams with Birmingham Bulldogs, Carlisle Centurions and Essex Eels elected from the Rugby League Conference. Bramley Buffaloes, were admitted after the demise of the professional Bramley club. Gateshead Storm also entered as late replacements for the defunct Teesside Steelers. The season was extended to twenty games starting a move towards a full season. Manchester Knights resigned from the league a few games before the end of the season.

The league was reduced back to 10 teams for the 2005 season. South London Storm joined the new Conference South Premier Division and Manchester Knights entered the Rugby League Conference Central Premier. The league went to a round robin 22 game home-and-away setup. Carlisle Centurions and Birmingham Bulldogs failed to complete the season, while Coventry Bears and Essex Eels resigned after the season and reentered the Rugby League Conference.

Ahead of the 2006 season Dewsbury Celtic entered from the Conference Central Premier and Featherstone Lions, just a month after failing to finish the season in the National Conference League, were accepted to National League Three to keep the number of teams to ten. A few weeks into the season Sheffield Hillsborough Hawks withdrew, Bradford Dudley Hill despite making the playoffs opted to return to the National Conference League and St Albans Centurions decided to join the Rugby League Conference Premier South Division, which left Hemel Stags as the only South of England team in the league.

=== 2007-2011: Rugby League Conference National Division ===
In 2007 the National League Three was abolished with the remaining seven club entered into the Rugby League Conference, creating a new league; the Rugby League Conference National Division which would be the top level of amateur summer rugby. Three teams from the Conference North Premier (Leeds Akkies, Cottingham Phoenix and East Lancashire Lions) were entered.

The new National Division was much more based around the North of England with Hemel the only team based in the South. A largely Naorthen based league saw far less resignations than its predecessor with only Cottingham Phoenix being expelled at the end of the 2007 season.

In 2008, Super League team, Crusaders entered their academy team after missing the deadline for entering the reserves league. Liverpool Buccaneers also joined the league while Leeds Akkies dropped down to the Conference Premier North. Bramley finished top of the league but the Colts won the Grand Final. During this season there were no withdrawals from the league and like the previous season a high fixture fulfilment rate.

In 2009, the league saw its first significant expansion since its rebrand in 2007, with Nottingham Outlaws entering for the first time and Carlisle Centurions returning to the league while Celtic Crusaders Colts joined the Super League Reserve grade.

After winning the Yorkshire Premier title in 2009, Kippax Knights enter red the National Fivision in 2010 while Gateshead Storm resigned to merged with Newcastle Knights in the North East league and East Lancashire Lions taking a season’s sabbatical to secure a new home base (they resurfaced as Accrington & Leyland Lions in the North West Premier Division in 2011). Carlisle Centurions and Liverpool Buccaneers failed to complete the season in 2010.

2011 was the National Leagues final season. Coventry Bears rejoined the competition for its final season and Welsh Champions Valley Cougars entered. Gateshead Thunder's reserve team, Gateshead Lightning intended to enter but they failed to start the season.

=== 2012: Merger with National Conference League ===
In 2011, members of the National Conference League voted to switch to play from winter to summer. This meant both major amateur competitions would be playing at the same time of year.

It was decided that the Rugby League Conference would be abolished and replaced by four summer regional leagues; Cumbria League, North West League, North East League and Yorkshire League.

The RLC National League would become the fourth tier of the National Conference League being rebranded as NCL Division Three.

The new division was a one season trial to see how amateur clubs coped with traveling with NCL Division Three being the most geographically spread league in the NCL. During the 2012 season there would be no promotion due to minimum standards.

Ahead of the new season Dewsbury Celtic and Featherstone Lions rejoined the National Conference League in Division Two, with the eight remaining clubs being joined by two clubs, Bristol Sonics and St Albans Centurions, stepping up from the Conference Premier. Valley Cougars dropped back to the Welsh League after the teams were announced and were replaced by South Wales Hornets (a feeder club for South Wales Scorpions. Despite finishing top of the league, Huddersfield Underbank Rangers were beaten 17-10 by Hemel Stags in the Grand Final.

At the end of the season it was announced Division Three would not continue in the same format. Winners, Hemel Stags were elevated to the professional Championship 1, while Coventry Bears, Huddersfield Underbank Rangers and Nottingham Outlaws were among nine clubs invited to join the new-look National Conference League. Nottingham Outlaws opted to join Conference League South along with Bristol Sonics and St Albans Centurions. After not being invited to continue in the NCL, Bramley Buffaloes and Kippax Knights dropped into the Yorkshire Men's League. Warrington Wizards merged with Woolston Rovers and applied for the National Conference League while South Wales Hornets folded.

== Results ==
Season	Champions	Score	Runners-up	League leaders
2003	Woolston Rovers	42-6	Teesside Steelers	Bradford Dudley Hill
2004	Coventry Bears	48-24	Woolston Rovers	Coventry Bears
2005	Bradford Dudley Hill	28-26	Bramley Buffaloes	Bradford Dudley Hill
2006	Bramley Buffaloes	30-8	Hemel Stags	Bramley Buffaloes
2007	Featherstone Lions			Bramley Buffaloes
2008	Crusaders Colts			Bramley Buffaloes
2009	Bramley Buffaloes			Bramley Buffaloes
2010	Warrington Wizards		Bramley Buffaloes	Bramley Buffaloes
2011	Huddersfield Underbank Rangers			Huddersfield Underbank Rangers

== See also ==
- Rugby League Conference
- National Conference League
- Conference League South
