= Halliwell Jones Stadium =

Rugby league stadium in Warrington, England

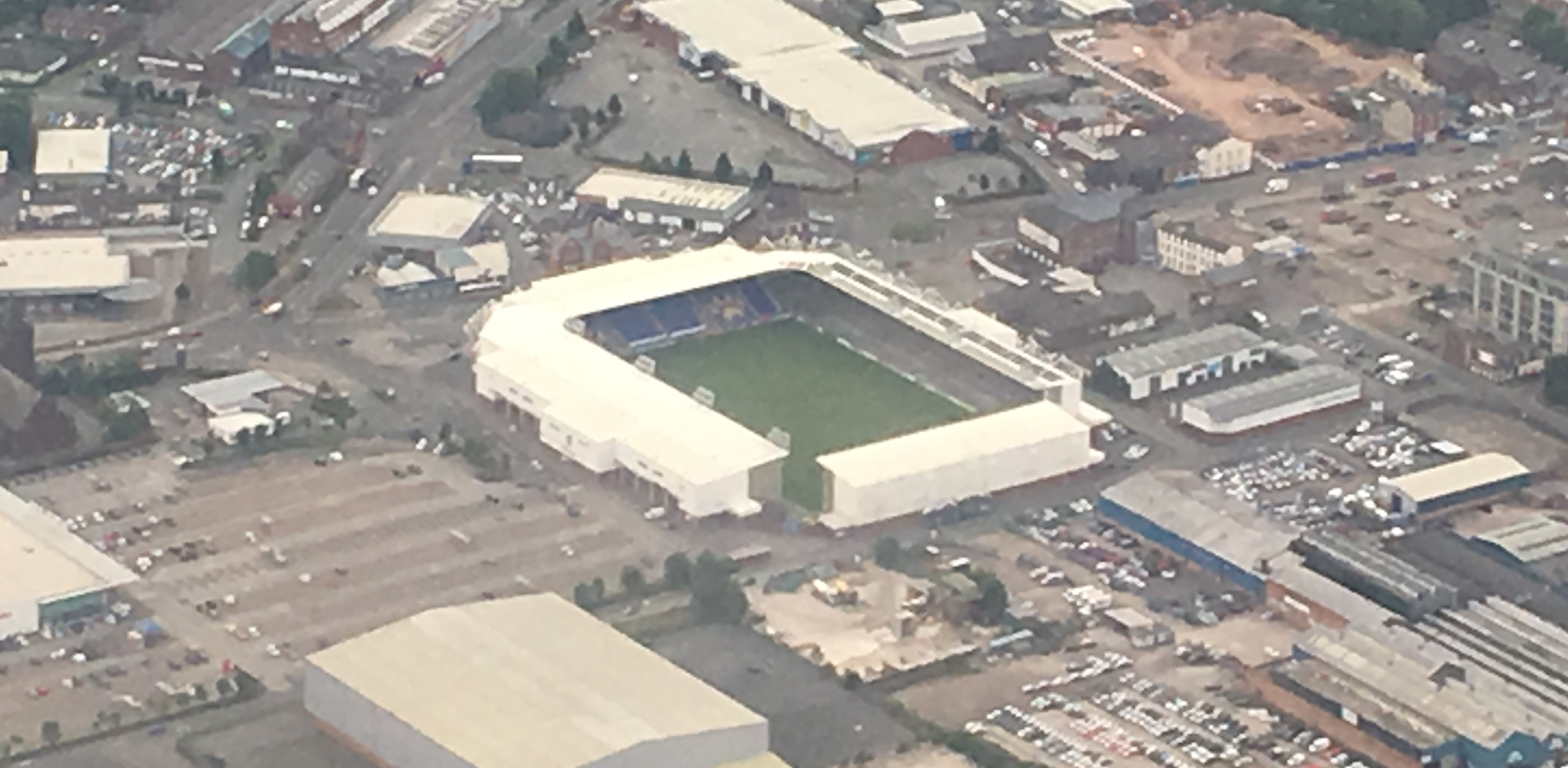
- Interactive map of Halliwell Jones Stadium
- Full name: The Halliwell Jones Stadium
- Location: Mike Gregory Way, Warrington, WA2 7NE, England
- Coordinates: 53°23′42″N 2°35′44″W
- Owner: Warrington Wolves
- Operator: Warrington Wolves
- Capacity: 15,300
- Surface: Grass
- Scoreboard: Philips Vidiwall
- Record attendance: 15,064 (Warrington vs St. Helens 13 February 2026)
- Field size: 120 by 74 yards (110 m × 68 m)
- Public transit: Warrington Central

Construction
- Built: 2002–2003
- Opened: 2004
- Expanded: 2011

Tenants
- Warrington Wolves (2003–present); Liverpool Reserves (2007–2009)

Halliwell Jones Stadium is a rugby league stadium in Warrington, England, which is the home ground of the Warrington Wolves. It has also staged Challenge Cup semi-finals, the European Nations Final, the National League Grand Finals' Day, two games of the 2013 Rugby League World Cup and four games of the 2021 Rugby League World Cup.

== History ==
=== 1990s–2004: Origins and construction ===
By the late 1990s, Warrington's Wilderspool Stadium had become decrepit and unfit for purpose, and so the club looked to move to a new stadium. Before settling on a site just north of the town centre, which had formerly housed the Tetley Walker brewery, a site in Burtonwood was considered but these plans were rejected.

Ground was broken at the new site in 2002 and bucked the common trend of modern stadia by including terracing areas rather than being an all-seater stadium, with the South and West stands both containing terracing. It also has large pitch dimensions of 120 by 74 metres (394 ft × 243 ft), as requested by Warrington's head coach of the time, Paul Cullen, due to his desire to play expansive rugby. The stadium officially opened on 21 February 2004 with 34–20 victory by Warrington against Wakefield Trinity.

=== 2011–present: Expansion ===
During the 2010 Championship Grand Final between Featherstone Rovers and Halifax, a fire beneath the terraced West Stand broke out, forcing all of the fans housed in the stand to be evacuated onto the field, holding up the game for around 45 minutes. Following a safety inspection the spectators were eventually allowed back in. However, when the smell of smoke failed to disperse, there was a further hold up as the fans were moved to the East Stand. The game resumed with no further interruptions. The fire was treated as arson.

On 3 March 2011, the club announced that the corners of the East Stand at the stadium would be filled in to create a further 2,000 spaces made up of seating and terracing for the 2012 season. The stadium capacity, set at 15,000 for the first sell-out home match against St. Helens in 2012, was increased to 15,200 and can grow to 15,693 as the club proves it can handle the bigger crowds and get extra safety certificates. The club has also announced plans to increase the stadium's capacity to around 22,000 should the need arise. The largest ever crowd at the Halliwell Jones was recorded on 14 April 2023, with a record crowd of 15,026 were in attendance.

The club announced that for just the opening game of the 2025 season, the stadium would be renamed the Luke Littler stadium, in honour of the World Darts champion who is a lifelong Warrington supporter.

== Brian Bevan monuments ==
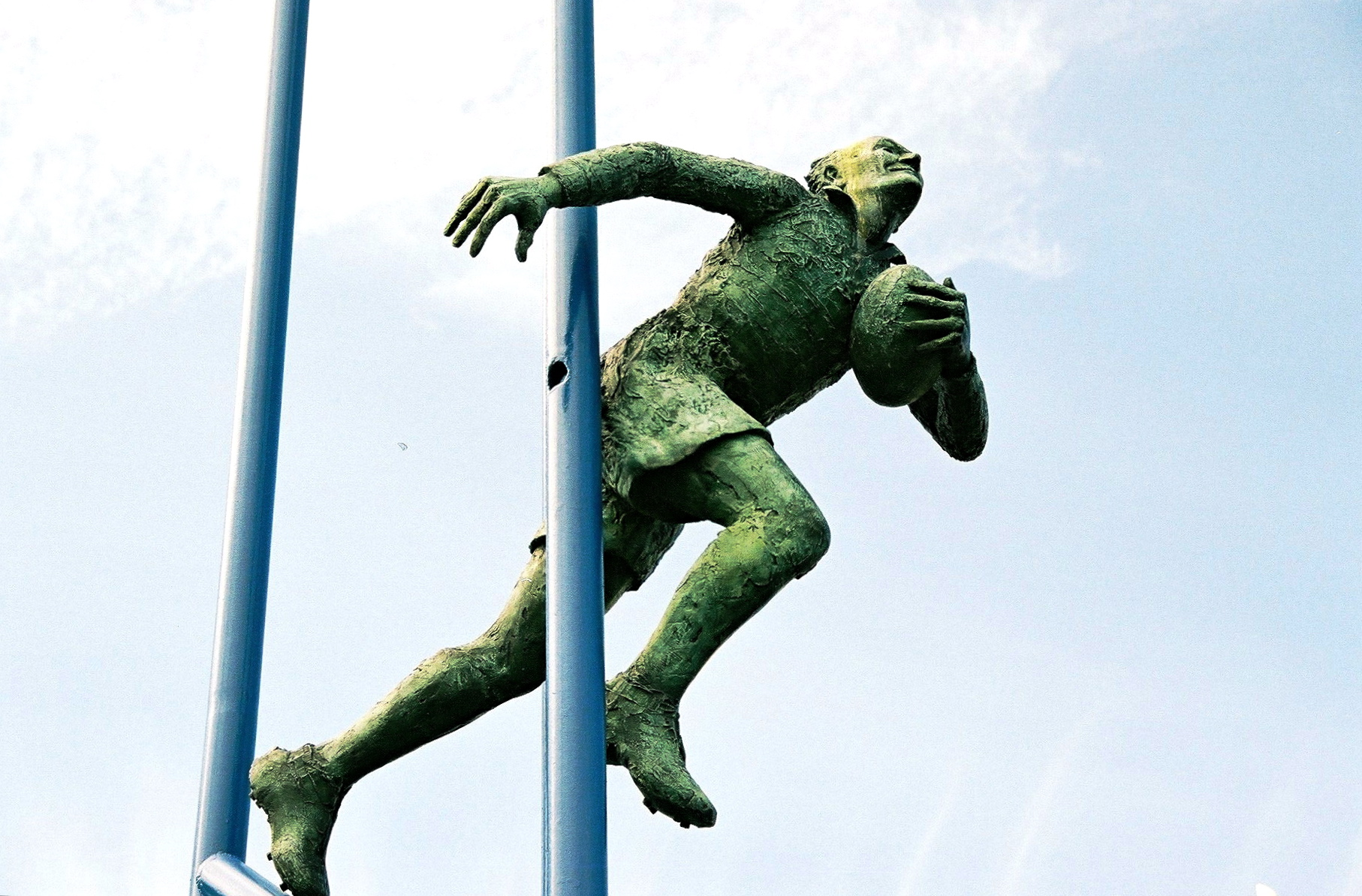
Statue of Brian Bevan at the Halliwell Jones Stadium

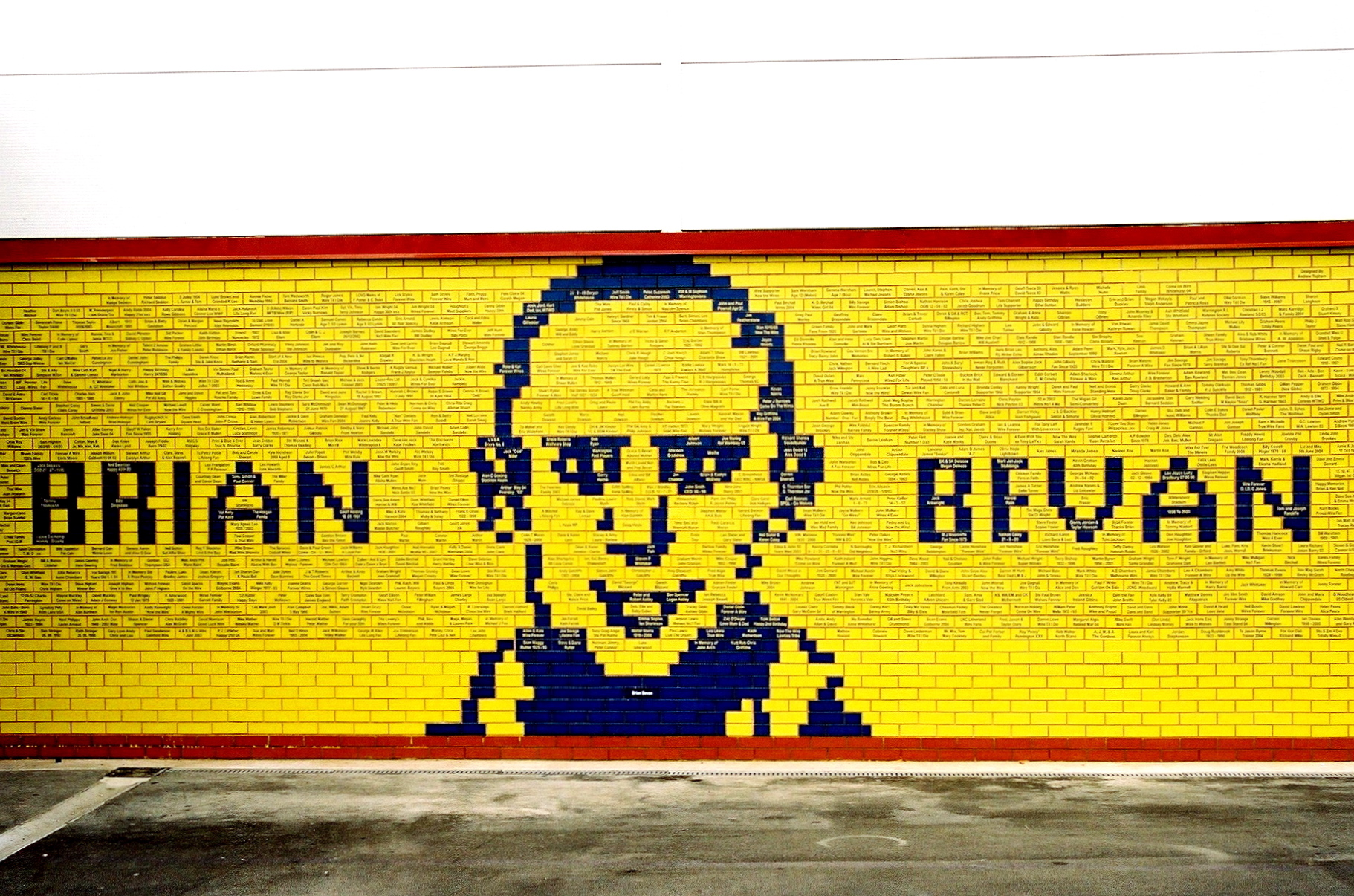
Brian Bevan commemorative mural

Two monuments to Australian winger and world record try scorer Brian Bevan, who played for Warrington 1945–62 (scoring 740 tries for the Wire), are featured at the stadium. One, a statue of him, had previously been placed in the middle of a roundabout (known as Brian Bevan island) close to Wolves' old Wilderspool ground. This was moved to the Halliwell Jones Stadium with the team. The other, a mural showing Bevan's face made from 'Primrose and Blue' bricks, the traditional Warrington colours was created specifically for the location.

Two other tributes to ex-players at the ground are the naming of the South-East quadrant the Jack Fish corner, and the road the stadium is on Mike Gregory Way.

== Layout ==
=== North Stand ===
The North Stand is the main stand of the ground, housing hospitality, changing rooms and dugout.

=== East Stand ===
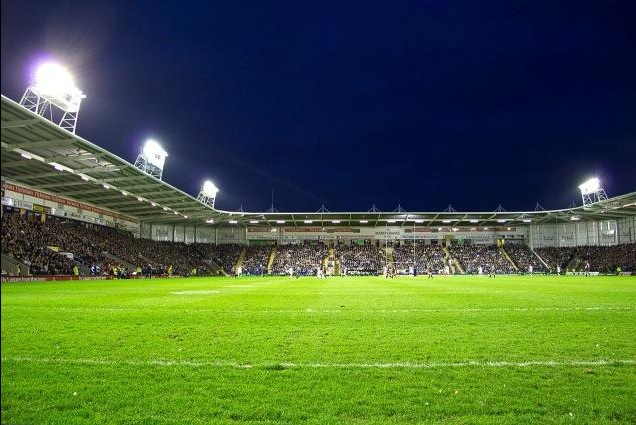
Halliwell Jones Stadium

The East Stand is situated behind the goal posts and is an all seater stand with hospitality boxes. In 2011, the corners next to the stand were filled in to increase the capacity.

=== South Stand ===
The South Stand runs along the side of the pitch and is terraced. It also houses the scoreboard and TV gantry.

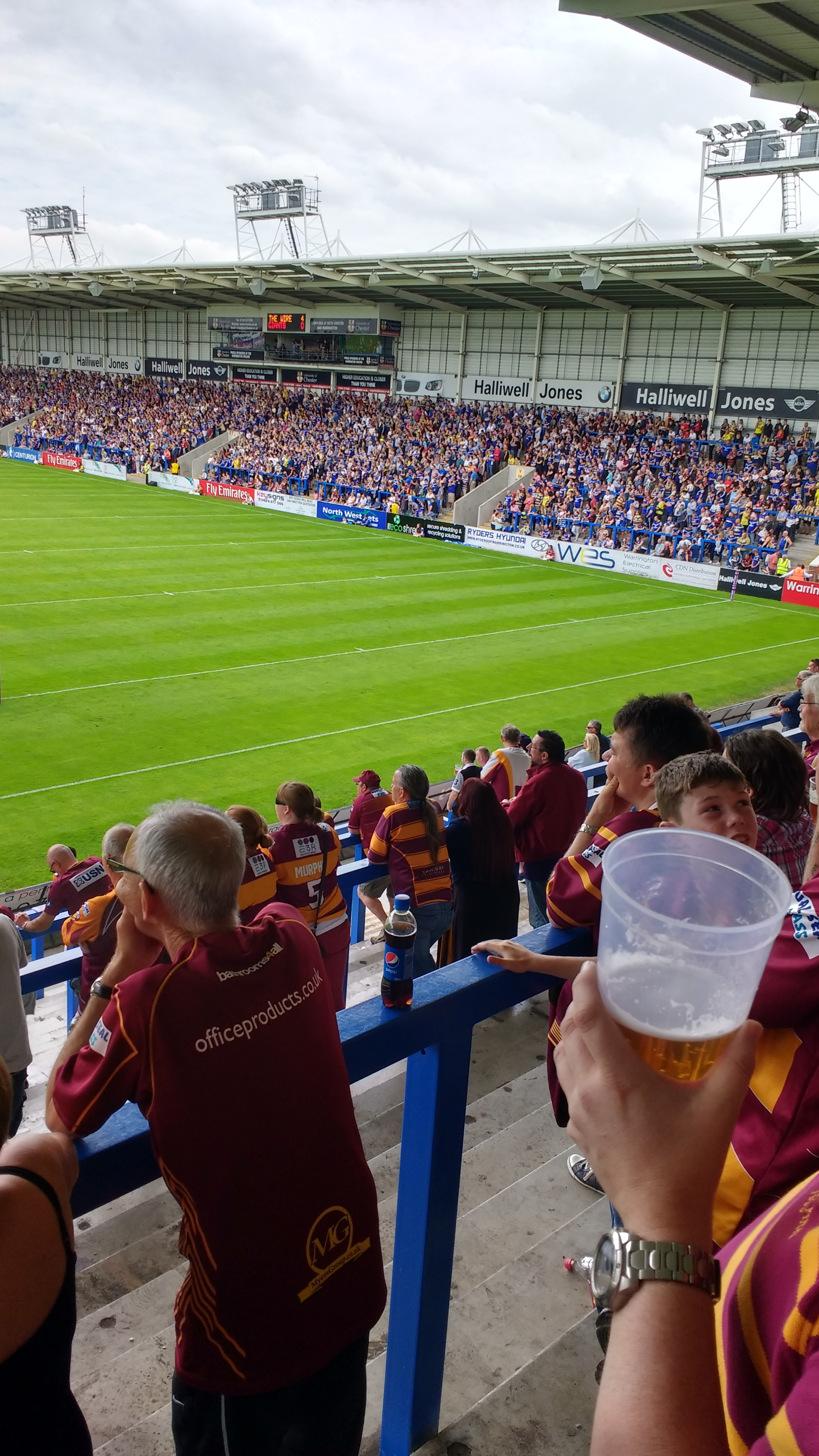
West Stand

=== West Stand ===
The West Stand is terraced and houses the away fans. Unlike the East Stand at the opposite end of the ground, the corners are not filled in but there are future plans to do so if there is demand for the capacity to be increased.

== Sponsorship ==
Halliwell Jones, which holds the naming rights for the stadium, is a large automotive retail group owned by Phillip Jones and family, a businessman from the North West.

Years	Sponsor	Name
2004-	Halliwell Jones	Halliwell Jones Stadium

== Usage ==
=== Rugby league ===
The stadium was primarily built as a rugby league venue and to be home of Warrington Wolves. It has also been used as a neutral venue on multiple occasions, the first being the Challenge Cup semi-finals since it opened in 2004:

Year	Winners	Score	Losers	Attendance
2004	St Helens	46–6	Huddersfield	13,134
2007	Catalans	37–24	Wigan	10,218
2009	Huddersfield	24–14	St Helens	10,638
2011	Wigan	18–12	St Helens	12,713
2015	Leeds	24–14	St Helens	11,107
2017	Wigan	27–14	Salford	10,796
2023	Leigh	12-10	St Helens	12,113
2026	Wigan	32-0	St Helens	13,421

After successfully hosting its first Challenge Cup semi final in 2004, the ground was also selected to hold the Championship Grand Final on five occasions from 2006 to 2011.

Year	League	Winners	Score	Losers	Attendance
2006	National League 1	Hull Kingston Rovers	29–16	Widnes	
2006	National League 2	Sheffield	35–10	Swinton	
2006	National League 3	Bramley	29–16	Hemel Stags	
2008	National League 1	Celtic Crusaders	18–36	Salford	
2008	National League 2	Doncaster RLFC	18–10	Oldham	
2008	National League 3	Crusaders Colts	?–?	Bramley	
2009	Championship	Barrow	26–18	Halifax	11,398
2009	League 1	Keighley	28–26	Oldham	11,398
2009	Conference	Bramley	?–?	Underbank Rangers	11,398
2010	Championship	Halifax	23–22 aet	Featherstone	9,443
2010	League 1	York	25–4	Oldham	9,443
2010	Conference	Warrington Wizards	?–?	Underbank Rangers	9,443
2011	Championship	Featherstone	40–4	Sheffield	7,263
2011	League 1	Keighley	32–12	Workington	7,263
2011	Conference	Underbank Rangers	?–?	Kippax Knights	7,263

In 2026, the stadium will host for the first time the final of the 1895 Cup between London Broncos and Widnes Vikings.

Year	Winners	Score	Losers	Attendance
2026	London Broncos	32–10	Widnes Vikings	4,829

In 2015, Warrington were chosen to play in the inaugural World Club Series. The club chose to host the game at the Halliwell Jones rather than move it to a bigger venue.

Year	Winners	Score	Losers	Attendance
2015	St George-Illawarra	18–12	Warrington	13,080
2017	Warrington	27–18	Brisbane	12,082

The Halliwell Jones has also been a venue for international rugby league, hosting a European Cup and World Cup.

Date	Winners	Score	Losers	Competition	Attendance
7 November 2004	England	36–12	Ireland	2004 European Cup	3,582
28 October 2011	Australia	26–12	New Zealand	2011 Four Nations	12,491
14 June 2013	England	42–24	Exiles	2013 International Origin	14,965
27 October 2013	New Zealand	42–24	Samoa	2013 World Cup	14,965
17 November 2013	Fiji	22–4	Samoa	2013 World Cup	12,766
16 October 2022	New Zealand	34–12	Lebanon	2021 World Cup	5,453
25 October 2022	Papua New Guinea	32–16	Cook Islands	2021 World Cup	6,273
30 October 2022	Samoa	62–4	France	2021 World Cup	6,756
6 November 2022	Tonga	18–20	Samoa	2021 World Cup	12,674

=== Association football ===
The Halliwell Jones was chosen as one of the venues to host the 2005 Women's European Championship. In 2007, Liverpool chose the stadium to host their reserve team, who played there until 2009.

- Liverpool reserves (2007–09)
- 2005 Women's European Championship

=== England's strongest man ===
The Halliwell Jones was chosen as the venue to hold the England's strongest man tournament in 2022 and 2023.

=== Non-sporting events ===
The Halliwell Jones held the Autumn Pops Concert with Three Sporting Tenors. In 2010, the ground was used to film an episode of Candy Cabs which aired in April 2011 on BBC One.
