= Scarborough Pirates A.R.L.F.C. =

Amateur rugby league club

Scarborough Pirates
- Skull and crossbones (fraternities and sports)

Club information
- Full name: Scarborough Pirates ARLFC
- Colours: Blue and white
- Founded: 2002

Current details
- Ground: Eastway Sports & Social Club, Eastway, Scarborough, North Yorkshire YO11 3LT
- Competition: Yorkshire Mens League

Scarborough Pirates ARLFC are an amateur rugby league team which competes in the Yorkshire Mens League. The club was based in Scarborough, North Yorkshire, England.

In a joint initiative with Breakaway Sports Tours, the Rugby Football League and Scarborough Borough Council, the club established a rugby league nines tournament known as the Scarborough Rugby League Festival.

== History ==
The Scarborough and District Primary Schools under-11s rugby league team, along with Glasgow Schools, was selected to play the curtain-raiser to the 2000 Challenge Cup Final at Murrayfield Stadium, Edinburgh on 29 April 2000. For several years, under-11s teams from non-traditional rugby league areas were selected by the RFL with the purpose of supporting the promotion of the sport.

Enthused parents of the team decided to form the Scarborough Pirates junior rugby league club soon afterwards, becoming the town's second junior rugby league club following Scarborough Sovereigns.

Originally based at Pindar School the club formed a link with the Aberdeen Pub with Landlord Nick Smart, a former professional rugby league footballer. The first season concluded with the team playing at under-12s, finishing fifth in the Hull & District League.

In 2002/2003, the club moved from its base at the Sunrise on Dean Road, Scarborough onto Scarborough F.C.’s McCain Lounge and the Mere Club, Seamer Road, before eventually returning to the Aberdeen, under new landlord Andy Dolan.

At the beginning of 2005 the club introduced an open-age team, which joined the North East Division of the Rugby League Conference. The side incorporated some remnants of the stand-alone Yorkshire Coast Tigers open-age team that had competed in the RLC previously and extended Scarborough's representation in that competition.

Professional player Kriss Brining, (York City Knights and Salford City Reds), started his career as a junior at the club.

In January 2019, the club folded and withdrew from the league. the Men's team had withdrawn from the competition in August 2018, with three matches yet to play, citing lack of interest and dwindling numbers. The Junior team folded in 2019.
