= Parkside Hawks =

Defunct English rugby league club, based in Hunslet, West Yorkshire

Parkside Hawks RLFC
Club information
- Full name: Parkside Hawks RLFC
- Nickname(s): Hawks
- Founded: 2009; 16 years ago

Current details
- Ground(s): South Leeds Stadium
- Competition: Rugby League Conference

Records
- Rugby League Conference Trophy: Harry Jepson Trophy (2011)

Parkside Hawks was a rugby league team based in Hunslet, Leeds. They played in the Yorkshire division of the Rugby League Conference.

== History ==
Parkside Hawks were formed in 2009 as a joint venture between Hunslet Parkside and Hunslet Hawks. Players were drawn from the Hawks under-18 side as well as from surrounding winter clubs such as Hunslet Old Boys, Hunslet Warriors, Queens, Milford, and East Leeds. Hawks joined the Midlands Merit League, a feeder competition for the Rugby League Conference, but were moved up to the RLC North Midlands division after 1 game. They went on to win the 2009 RLC North Midlands title.

The club were in the newly formed Yorkshire division for the 2010 season and went on to win it before making it to the RLC regional finals where they lost to Northampton Demons. In the 2011 season, Parkside Hawks won the Yorkshire (West) division and thus qualified for the Yorkshire Premier play-offs; this they won before making it to the finals of the RLC Premier division and winning the Harry Jepson Trophy by beating Accrington and Leyland Lions 24–16.

== Club honours ==
- RLC North Midlands Division: 2009
- RLC Yorkshire Division: 2010
- RLC Yorkshire Premier: 2011
- Harry Jepson Trophy: 2011
