= Moorends-Thorne Marauders A.R.L.F.C. =

English amateur rugby league club

Thorne-Moorends Marauders
Club information
- Full name: Moorends-Thorne Marauders RLFC
- Colours: Royal Blue and Primrose yellow
- Founded: 1976; 50 years ago (2004; 22 years ago)
- Website: http://www.pitchero.com/clubs/moorendsthornemarauders/

Current details
- Competition: Rugby League Conference Yorkshire Premier

Moorends-Thorne Marauders RLFC is a rugby league club based in Thorne, Doncaster, South Yorkshire.

They play in the Yorkshire Premier of the Rugby League Conference during the summer and in the Premier Division of the CMS Yorkshire league during the winter. They also have an A_team in the Yorkshire & Humber Merit League.

== Two cultures come together ==
In 2003 the amateur game in the North East of Doncaster was dying slowly, a few ex-Moorends ARLFC players and committee men got together to form Thorne Moor Marauders to play in the RLC.

In preparation for the 2004 season, they targeted local soccer and rugby union players and soon had a squad of over 40 players training - including 7 Moorends and 2 Doncaster Toll Bar amateur players.

After the first season, fifteen summer players made rugby league their first sport and joined the winter team. This prompted the committee to hold talks with Moorends ARLFC to merge the two clubs and play all year.

== Moorends history ==
The club brings together the two cultures of amateur rugby league, Moorends Marauders ARLFC (Winter) & Thorne Moor Marauders RLFC (Summer). Moorends started its life in the 1976/77 season playing in the West Yorkshire Sunday League, gaining promotion in its first season in the runners up spot. In its first season, Moorends also managed to reach the Doncaster Cup Final losing out to Rossington Hornets.

Moorends enjoyed league success over the next few seasons and gradually reached the West Yorkshire Second Division. During this time, the club gained one or two big cup scalps along the way (Bison Sports, Thornhill Lees, and INL York) but were always the bridesmaid when it came to the local cups and top-four play-offs.

The 1982/83 season saw a mass exodus of experienced players, including some of the founding members, to the newly formed Thorne Youth. This resulted in the club's first-ever relegation back to the West Yorkshire Third Division.

The regrouped 1983/84 season saw the Moorends club move straight back into the Second division under their first ever out of town coach Bill Kenny. Then came the first league switch brought on because the club felt it was not being treated fairly at disciplinary meetings, so Moorends went to the Humberside League.

Moorends enjoyed their first cup success in 1984/85 under the coaching of Hull FC hooker Ronnie Wileman, winning the James Noonen Trophy and narrowly missing out on the double by one point, after having two points deducted for playing an unregistered player in their 26–0 win against Crows Nest. The following season saw the club achieve a very respectable fifth place in the Humberside Premier Division.

Again Moorends suffered a major setback, losing seven players as well as suffering the club's first major injury.

Over the next two season the Moorends and Marshland Rangers clubs amalgamated to form one club under the Moorends banner, over the following two seasons Moorends flirted with the Yorkshire league on a Saturday before settling down back in the West Yorkshire Sunday League and going on to have its most successful period to date winning:

- The Premier Division five times on the trot,
- The Yorkshire Sunday Cup twice and the top four play-offs twice,
- The Doncaster cup five times

and also playing in the Challenge Cup in 1993/94 season going out to Barrow Island from the National Conference League Premier Division and again in 1994/95 - this time becoming the only Sunday League team to reach the third round after beating Askam from the National Conference Premier 10-15, Thatto Heath North West Counties Premier 12-10 before going out to the top of the National One Whitehaven 64-12.

With all this success, Moorends decided to try their hand back in the Yorkshire League on a Saturday and over the next five years won the Yorkshire Senior division and were relegated back. The 2003/04 season saw a mass decline in the club's player strength and it had to forfeit a few away games.

This decline kicked into gear a new local initiative, which brought together people who cared about the amateur game locally to form Doncasters first Rugby League Conference team the Thorne Moor Marauders RLFC. The Marauders drew on its past amateur experience and the guidance of the RLC. With a backbone of nine players with rugby league experience and more than thirty who had come along to play rugby league for the first time, the coaching staff of Chris Allen and Howard Roberts pushed, pulled and built Thorne Moor Marauders into a side that went on to win the Yorkshire Shield 34-6 against South Wakefield Sharks and be beaten finalists in the National Shield 29-20 after being 26-0 down against Cardiff Demons.

The 2004/05 winter season saw the Moorends club gain a large influx of summer players in their squad, fulfilling all their fixtures with players to spare. As well as gaining promotion to the Yorkshire Premier Division, the club also contested the Yorkshire Senior Cup Final going down 26-20 to Sharlston Rovers. The combination of two clubs sharing players brought about the formation of one club with the production of new players its priority and already between them they have under 16s and 14s playing with under 10s and 8s training.

The 2005 RLC season saw the summer team playing in the North Midlands Division where they became champions defeating minor premiers Derby City in the final, and also reached the national semi-final, before going down to the competition winners Wetherby Bulldogs.

In 2006 the club went one step further, reaching the regional final before losing narrowly to Liverpool Buccaneers. In 2008, Moorends became the RLC regional champions beating Bristol Sonics 36 v 16 in the final at Derby.

== Club honours ==
- RLC North Midlands Division: 2005
- RLC North Midlands and South Yorkshire Division: 2006
- RLC South Yorkshire and Lincolnshire Division: 2008
- RLC Regional: 2008
- RL Merit League: 2008
- Yorkshire & Humber Merit League: 2010
