= London League =

London League may refer to:

- London League (rugby league), a contemporary rugby league competition
- London League (football), a defunct association football league
