= Jason Lee (rugby league) =

Wales international rugby league footballer & coach

Personal information
- Full name: Jason Lee
- Born: 16 January 1971 (age 54)

Playing information
- Position: Wing
Club
Years	Team	Pld	T	G	FG	P
1994–95	Warrington Wolves	12	4	0	0	16
1997–01	Keighley Cougars	2	2	3	0	14
2001	Halifax	11	2	0	0	8
2002–04	Doncaster	65	43	3	0	178
	Total	90	51	6	0	216
Representative
Years	Team	Pld	T	G	FG	P
1994–01	Wales	7	4	0	0	16

Coaching information
Club
Years	Team	Gms	W	D	L	W%
2012	Dudley Hill	33	23	1	9	70
2015–	Dudley Hill	59	37	1	21	63
	Total	92	60	2	30	65

Jason Lee (born 16 January 1971) is the head coach of Dudley Hill and former professional rugby league footballer who played in the 1990s and 2000s. He played at representative level for Wales, and at club level for Dudley Hill (in Bradford), Warrington Wolves, Keighley, Halifax and Doncaster, as a wing.

== Playing career ==
=== International honours ===
Jason Lee won 5 caps (plus 2 as substitute) for Wales in 1994–2001 while at Warrington Wolves, Keighley Cougars, and Halifax 2-tries 8-points.

=== Club career ===
Jason Lee made his début for Warrington Wolves on Wednesday 9 November 1994, and he played his last match for Warrington Wolves Sunday 24 September 1995.

== Post-rugby career ==
Since the end of his playing career, Lee has coached at amateur level, and is currently coach for Bradford-based club Dudley Hill. Lee has worked in education since retiring from the professional game, and is currently Behaviour Lead at Hanson School in Bradford.
