= East Cumbria Crusaders =

English amateur rugby league club

Club information
- Full name: East Cumbria Crusaders ARLFC
- Colours: Blue, red and white
- Founded: 2003; 22 years ago
- Website: Official Site

Current details
- Ground(s): Creighton RUFC
- Competition: Rugby League Conference North East Division

East Cumbria Crusaders is a rugby league club based in Carlisle, Cumbria. They play in the North East Division of the Rugby League Conference. Their home ground is Creighton RUFC.

== History ==
The club were founded in 2003 as Carlisle Centurions by former international Bev Risman and joined the North West Division of the Rugby League Conference which it won. The Centurions went on to reach the Grand Final of the Harry Jepson Trophy in 2003 when they were narrowly beaten at Wilderspool Stadium by Bridgend Blue Bulls.

The 2004 season saw Carlisle Centurions leave the Conference to join the newly formed National League Three. Centurions 'A' continued to play in the Conference in a newly formed Cumbrian Division but withdrew mid-season.

However, Carlisle Centurions failed to complete the 2005 National League Three because of travelling difficulties causing serious player-availability issues. The club was reformed in 2006 under coach Geoff Grieves and returned to the Rugby League Conference in 2006 joining the North Division. The club began to cut its early reliance on out-of-season West Cumbrian British Amateur Rugby League Association players and focused on gaining new recruits. The club failed to reach the final losing out to Liverpool Buccaneers.

Carlisle stepped up to the Premier North in 2007 and won it; they continued in this competition in 2008 and successfully defended their title. In both 2007 and 2008 the club lost out at the National semi-final stage to Coventry Bears and Nottingham Outlaws, suffering from a lack of genuine competition in the Northern Premier competition. In 2009, they returned to National League Three and reconstituted as the Rugby League Conference National Division. Former Workington Town player Dennis Bibby became coach after Grieves left mid-season.

Carlisle Centurions withdrew from the National Division mid-season in 2010 after suffering a string of heavy defeats and struggling to raise a team.

The club regrouped as East Cumbria Crusaders with a host of younger, inexperienced players, playing out of Creighton rugby union club. They joined the RLC North East Division. East Cumbria Crusaders moved up to the North East Premier Conference in 2012 after winning 13 of 14 regular league fixtures in the NE Regional Conference in 2011.

== Honours ==
- RLC North West Division: 2003
- RLC North Division: 2006
- RLC North Premier: 2007, 2008
- RLC North East Regional: League Leaders' Shield 2011
- North East Rugby League Regional Division: 2013
