= Nottingham Outlaws (rugby league team) =

English amateur rugby league club

Club information
- Full name: Nottingham Outlaws Rugby League Club
- Nickname(s): Outlaws
- Colours: White shirts with blue and green chevron
- Founded: 1999; 26 years ago
- Website: www.nottinghamrl.co.uk

Current details
- Ground(s): Lenton Lane, Nottingham NG7 2SA
- Competition: Yorkshire Men's League

Nottingham Outlaws are a rugby league club from the city of Nottingham, England. They were founded in 1999 and their first team plays in the Premier Division of the Yorkshire Men's League. They have a junior section and in 2006 launched an academy team. They play their home matches at their own ground at Lenton Lane Nottingham NG7. They are also known as the 'hooded men'.

== History of rugby league in Nottingham ==
The first Nottingham rugby league club took part in the Southern Amateur Rugby League some time between 1965 and 1973. The club is believed to have been a university team.

In the late 1980s an attempt was made to introduce semi-professional rugby league into Nottingham with the creation of Nottingham City, who replaced another Nottinghamshire team, the Mansfield Marksman. In 1992-1993 they finished bottom of Division 3 of the Rugby League and were demoted to the National Conference League. They achieved the dubious honour of being the recipient of one of the widest margins of defeat in rugby league history when they lost 138–0 to Barrow in 1994. Official records

Nottingham Foresters were the first community team to form in Nottingham. They were based at The Forester pub in the city centre; the landlord was one of the founder members. When the landlord left the following year the club relocated to The Crusader pub near the Nottingham Polytechnic playing fields, where the club played, and the club changed its name to Nottingham Crusaders in 1986. The club joined the now defunct Mansfield and Nottingham Amateur Rugby League Association, which later became the EMARLA (East Midlands Amateur Rugby League Association) league, and played there until 1995. Nottingham Crusaders then played in the Yorkshire League from 1995/96 to 1998/99 but kept an A-team in the EMARLA.

== History of the Outlaws ==
Nottingham Outlaws RLFC were founded in 1998 when a number of players from the Nottingham Crusaders Yorkshire League outfit decided to explore the possibility of playing in the emerging Rugby League Conference. The newly founded Nottingham club took the name "Outlaws" in deference to the follows of local legend Robin Hood. The club colours were taken from the local Nottingham Trent University. The club joined the Northern Division of the Rugby League Conference that same year. In its early years the club were based in Wilford village at Nottingham Moderns RUFC.

They moved to the newly created Midlands Division in 2001. As the Conference expanded further, new Divisions were added and in 2003, the Outlaws joined the East Midlands Division.

After twice winning the East Midlands division in both 2003 and 2004 they accepted an invitation to join the new Central Premier Division in 2005. This was a step-up in standard and included tough games against rugby league heartland sides in Hull Phoenix, Leeds Akkies, Bolton-le-Moors and Dewsbury Celtic.

In 2006 the club competed in the Midlands Premier division, finishing as league leaders and then winning the Midlands Grand Final against Coventry Bears. This set up a national semi-final against East Lancashire Lions, which they lost by 28–12. The academy team reached the Merit League final but were beaten 42-18 by the South Humber Rabbitohs.

The club again ran two teams in 2007, competing in the same competitions. The first team were beaten in the RLC Premier Midlands final 18-30 by Coventry Bears after finishing second in the league and the second team lost 26–32 to East Riding in the MML Shield Final. Three junior teams and a ladies team also competed for the club in 2007.

In 2008, the club re-located from Moderns RUFC to The Bay, training ground of Nottingham RUFC; Leeds Akkies coach Martin Crick was recruited as Head Coach and a host of new signings from the powerful Loughborough University Rugby League team. The club achieved success, taking the Midlands Premier crown from Coventry Bears in a 44–0 win before beating Carlisle Centurions in the semi-final and then West London Sharks in the final to win the Harry Jepson Trophy for the first time in the club's history. The reserve grade side also won the RL Merit League Shield. The club also fielded a women's team and juniors at under-16, under-14, under-12 and under-11. the club applied for, and were granted, entrance to the RLC National Division in 2009.

They made their debut in the Challenge Cup in January 2009 but lost narrowly to Loughborough University.

In 2012 the heartlands winter leagues switched to summer and this led to a realignment of the community game. Outlaws were one of the few non-heartland teams to maintain a position at national level, operating in the 3rd tier of the national pyramid in the National Conference League Division 3. In 2013 the Outlaws switched to play in the newly formed Conference League South. The Outlaws reached the Grand Final in the competition's inaugural season, losing out 32–24 to Sheffield-Hallam Eagles. In 2014, they were prevented from reaching a second consecutive Grand Final after a semi-final defeat away to eventual champions Valley Cougars.

In 2014, the Outlaws launched Project 30 - a scheme to raise money to help secure a permanent home for the club and the sport of rugby league in the city of Nottingham.

In 2015 they lifted the Conference league south championship by beating defending champions Valley Cougars 39–12 at Bath.

In 2018, the club finally secured a permanent home at Lenton Lane, the former site of the now-defunct Greenwood Meadows F.C.

== Women's team ==
In 2012, the women's team took part in the inaugural Women's Challenge Cup in which they reached the quarter-finals before losing to Featherstone Rovers. In 2024, the team joined the Midlands Championship.

== Juniors ==
Nottingham Outlaws' junior teams take part in the Midlands Junior League.

In 2009, Outlaws under-16s were crowned Midlands Champions, leading to a number of players being selected to represent the East Midlands and later the full Midlands teams. Numerous players have since gone on the achieve this at various age groups from under-12 to under-18.

2012 saw five Outlaws juniors being selected to tour Serbia with the Midlands under-18s.

The successful development of players at the club has also seen players involved with professional clubs, Sheffield Eagles, Wakefield Trinity Wildcats and Castleford Tigers.

== Club honours ==
- RLC North Midlands Division: 2003, 2004
- RLC Midlands Premier: 2006, 2008
- Harry Jepson Trophy: 2008
- RL Merit League Shield: 2008
- Conference League South Champions: 2015
