= Leeds Akkies =

English amateur rugby league club, based in Leeds, West Yorkshire

Club information
- Full name: Leeds Akkies Rugby League Football Club
- Founded: 2003
- Exited: 2024

Former details
- Ground: Old Modernians, Cookridge
- Competition: Yorkshire Mens League

Leeds Akkies were a rugby league team based in The Old Modernians Sports Club, Cookridge Lane, Leeds, LS16 7ND, West Yorkshire. They played in the Yorkshire Men's League.

== History ==
Leeds Akademiks were founded in 2003 by students from the three Universities of Leeds to provide a pathway from student rugby league to open age amateur rugby league. They were admitted into the North East Division of the Rugby League Conference in 2003, playing out of West Park Bramhope RUFC. This was to pave the way for a huge influx of truly heartland teams the following season, drastically changing the face of the Conference.

Leeds won the North East Division in 2003 and the newly formed Yorkshire Division in 2004.

Leeds Akademiks had to change their moniker to Akkies due to a legal challenge from an American clothing brand named Akademik in 2005. The newly renamed Leeds Akkies joined the newly created Central Premier Division which they won. Leeds Akkies were defeated by the Bridgend Blue Bulls in the Grand Final of the Harry Jepson Trophy.

In 2007 the club joined the newly renamed RLC National Division and fielded three open age teams during a season at Weetwood, whilst redevelopment work took place at West Park. The club ended the season a tour to Barcelona - becoming the first British side to face local opposition on Spanish soil when they defeated a Catalan Universities XIII in Girona.

The Akkies launched its first women's team in 2008 whilst the men's team dropped to the Premier North. The club again fielded men's sides in the RLC Yorkshire Premier and Regional divisions in 2009. The club's women's side came within points difference of claiming the WRLC Yorkshire minor premiership and a place in the national play-offs. Leeds Mongrels RL were formed in 2009 by Leeds Akkies club member Carl Brown as an opportunity to play rugby league at a social level. They became part of the Akkies in 2010.

In 2010 the club ended its seven-year association with West Park Leeds RUFC in order to accept an invitation to join the Old Modernians Association in Cookridge, north-west Leeds. In 2013, the club joined the Entry League of the Yorkshire Men's League.

Akkies 2016 went unbeaten at home all season and had 2 narrow away losses which crowned them champions with a well trained team coached by Dr. Charanjit Sandhu of Wortley.

In June 2024, The club announced that it would close due to lack of players and having withdrawn from the Yorkshire Men's League midway through the previous season.

== Club honours ==
- RLC North East Division: 2003
- RLC Yorkshire Division: 2004
- RLC Central Premier: 2005
- Women's RLC Plate: 2011
- Yorkshire division 2 champions 2016
