= St Albans Centurions =

English amateur rugby league club

Club information
- Full name: St Albans Centurions Rugby League Club
- Colours: Dark blue and yellow
- Founded: 1996; 30 years ago
- Website: Cents Official Website

Current details
- Ground: Toulmin Drive, St Albans.
- Competition: East Rugby League

The St Albans Centurions are a rugby league club based in St Albans, Hertfordshire. The club plays their home games at Toulmin Drive, St Albans and their clubhouse is in High Oaks, St Albans.

Founded in 1996, they first played in various local leagues and the Rugby League Conference, and then, from 2003 to 2006, in National League 3. From 2007 to 2011, they played in the Rugby League Conference South Premier Division. 2007 & 2010 also saw the club win the 'Triple', the League Championship, the Southern Premiership Grand Final and the National Grand Final. In 2012 the club was invited to take part in the 'experimental' National Conference League Division Three, a one-season only trial by the RFL and NCL to see how amateur clubs cope with travelling all over England and Wales to play their games. As a result, in the 2012 experiment, 2013 saw the Centurions play for one season in the newly set up Conference League South. 2015 sees The Cents playing in the East Rugby League.

== History ==
The first rugby league club in St Albans was launched in 1970 by the landlord of The Beehive pub just off London Road, St Albans Beehive RLFC lasted four seasons and were followed by St Albans Waverley for a year in the mid-seventies.

The St Albans Centurions was established in 1996 by Gary Tetlow and Ken Edwards and their first game was lost narrowly to a Hemel Hempstead development team. In 1997 the Centurions replaced the Ashford club in London League Division 2, and progressed to the second round of the knock-out competitions. Later that year the Centurions signed a membership agreement with Old Verulamians rugby union club to secure ground sharing, giving them a firm base and offering good facilities for both players and sponsors. The team finished second in the league that season and established a rugby league development team to encourage junior development.

The under-13s competed in a festival of rugby league in 1998 and also in the London Junior Competition and the senior team were accepted into the Rugby League Conference, where they finished runners-up in the Southern Division. The team was beaten in the semi-finals by the eventual winners, Crawley Jets.

The team fielded a second team for the first time in 1999, and the first junior player graduated to the Open Age side.

The club consolidated itself in the Conference in 2000-2 and in the London League.

In 2003, the club entered the newly created National League 3, playing teams from all over the country. They reached the play-offs, beating Sheffield Hillsborough Hawks before going down to Warrington Woolston Rovers. They also entered the Rugby League Challenge Cup, losing to Birkenshaw in the first round.

The Centurions finished 7th in the league in 2004 and then shocked Bradford Dudley Hill in the play-offs before losing to Bramley Buffaloes.

2005 The first team won 12 out of 16 league matches, finishing third and lost in the play-off semi-finals. The second team continued to play in the Conference winning all games and snagging the RLC Eastern Division Silverware, the club continued its junior development programme. The club also relocated its home ground across town to share with Old Albanian Rugby Football Club at Woollam's.

2006 The first team qualified for the play-offs in fourth place in National League Three. It beat Dewsbury Celtic but lost an elimination match to the Warrington Wizards. The team also competed in the Northern Rail Cup, taking on semi-professional outfits London Skolars and Crusaders.

2007 League Champions, Southern Grand Final Winners & National Grand Final Winners. The Cents relocated to Colney Heath and relaunched itself with a new committee and a new club logo in preparation for the 2007 season. The Cents then joined the Rugby League Conference South Premier and went from strength to strength. The Centurions won 12 of their 14 seasonal league games and finished top of the Conference, they also became Major Premiers of the Southern Conference by beating South London Storm 16 – 10 in the Southern Grand Final. St Albans went through to represent the South in the national semi-finals and defeated the Welsh Champions Bridgend Blue Bulls 42 – 16. The Cents then went on to win the National Grand Final and the Harry Jepson Trophy by defeating the Midland champions, Coventry Bears by 28 -20.

2008 was a mixed season for the club, St Albans won the North London Cup, a pre-season 'round robin' tournament between themselves, London Skolars A-team and Hemel Stags. Unfortunately the loss of nine retiring players from last years squad, and a string of injuries meant the club finished fourth in the Rugby League Conference Southern Premier. In October, due to the increasing number of junior teams and limitations of facilities at Colney Heath, the club moved back to their original ground at Cotlandswick, on the outskirts of St Albans.

2009 was a good year for the club as they settled down to life at their new ground. The senior squad finished 3rd in the Rugby League Conference Southern Premier, only losing three games all season, but were knocked out of the end of season play-offs by the eventual National Champions, West London Sharks.

2010 League Champions, Southern Grand Final Winners & National Grand Final Winners. St Albans Centurions won all their games except one in the Southern Premiership and were crowned League Champions. In the Major Premiership play-offs that follow the end of the regular season The Cents defeated the Eastern Rhinos in the semi-finals by 60 points to 6, and then won the Grand Final against West London by 54 points to 4. In September the Centurions, playing as Southern Champions, defeated the Welsh Champions, Valley Cougars in the National Semi-finals before going on to win The Harry Jepson Trophy by defeating the Midlands Champions Coventry Bears by 56 points to 4.

2011 The club has taken possession of its own ground and clubhouse at Toulmin Drive, St Albans. The Cents finished second in the league and were losing Grand Finalists.

2012 The Cents were asked by the RFL to take part in the 'National Conference League Three', an experimental, one season-only league that was being set up to see how top amateur and open clubs from all over England and Wales would cope playing in a league involving long-distance travelling and other issues. The Cents finished seventh in that league, missing out on the play-offs by one point.

2013 The Centurions played for one season in the newly set up Conference League South. It is the highest level of 'open' rugby league in the South of England and the English Midlands. The Centurions intend to return to the Southern Premiership in 2014.

2014 The Cents played in the Southern Premiership, finishing 5th. They also won two pre season tournaments, The Raging Bull Shield & The Sports Relief Trophy.

2015 After a 'rejigging' of the leagues, the Centurions now play in the East Rugby League, a league for teams from Herts, Beds and Norfolk. They finished third in that league.

2016 Cents finished second in the East Rugby League and made the play off semi finals.

2017 Finished fourth in the league, won the East RL 9-a-side tournament and made the play off semi finals.

2018 Finished third in the league and were East RL Cup finalists.

2019 Finished third in the league and won the East RL Cup Final.

2020 Due to COVID-19, there was no East Rugby League competition this year.

2021 Due to COVID-19, there was a shortened East Rugby League competition. The Cents, led by head coach Sam Wingad, were Cup Finalists and finished second in the league.

2022 Cents finished top of the East Rugby League, finishing the season unbeaten. They also won the Grand Final. The U14's won the London League Grand Final.

== Juniors ==
Centurions Juniors play at under-9, under-12 and under-14 level in the summer London Junior League.

In 2015 the Cents Under 14 team finished as league champions in the London(North) League after going the whole season undefeated in the league. In 2017 the Under 13's were league champions of the London League.

== Club honours ==
- London Bowl Winners: 1998
- RLC Eastern Division Champs: 2005
- London RFL (U16's) – League Champions & Grand Final Winners: 2006
- RLC Premier South League Champions: 2007
- RLC Premier South Grand Final Winners: 2007
- Harry Jepson Trophy/National Grand Final Winners: 2007
- North London Cup: 2008
- RLC Premier South League Champions: 2010
- RLC Premier South Grand Final Winners: 2010
- Harry Jepson Trophy/National Grand Final Winners: 2010
- RLC Premier South Runners Up: 2011
- RLC Premier South Grand Finalists: 2011
- Raging Bull Trophy & Sports Relief Trophy Winners: 2014
- London League (Under 14's) – League Champions: 2015
- East Rugby League Runners Up : 2016
- London League (Under 13's) Winners : 2017
- East Rugby League 9-A-Side Tournament Winners : 2017
- East Rugby League Play Off Semi Finalists : 2017
- East Rugby League Cup Finalists : 2018
- East Rugby League Cup Winners : 2019
- East Rugby League Cup Finalists : 2021
- East Rugby League Runners Up : 2021
- London League Cup Winners (Under 14's) : 2022
- East Rugby League, League Champions :2022
- East Rugby League Grand Final Winners : 2022

== Representative honours ==
- Nick Surtees, Scotland Rugby League
- Dene Miller, Scotland A
- Andy Lake, GB Community Lions and England Lionhearts
- Rudie vd Mewre, England Lionhearts and Exiles Representatives
- Oli Fountain, England Lionhearts
- Paul Maloney, Ireland Wolfhounds Rugby League
- Matt Stringer, England Lionhearts & British Police
- Josh Lawrence, English Colleges
- Nick Woolley, GB Teachers
- Joseph Baker, GB Teachers and East of England
- Tom Spratt, East of England
- Kristian Naylor, East of England
- Adam Jasinski, Poland Rugby League
