= Kippax Knights =

English amateur rugby league club, based in West Yorkshire

- Knight

Club information
- Full name: Kippax Knights RLFC
- Colours: Green, gold and white
- Founded: 2009; 17 years ago
- Website: www.pitchero.com/clubs/kippaxknights/

Current details
- Ground: Longdike Lane, Kippax, Leeds, West Yorkshire, LS25 7BP
- Competition: Yorkshire Men's League

Kippax Knights are an amateur rugby league team based in Kippax, Leeds, England. The team plays in the Yorkshire Men's League.

== History ==
=== 1948-2009 ===
Kippax Welfare rugby league has been a part of Kippax village for many years. The first team was formed in 1948 by Jack Kielty based at the Old Tree inn. In 1958 Kippax went on to win the Yorkshire Cup beating Castleford Lock Lane. By the late 1960s through to the 70s, Kippax were now playing from the White Swan.

Kippax has played in the Challenge Cup qualifying rounds on numerous occasions, but 1973–74 was the first time Kippax played in the proper first round of the Challenge Cup coming up against Leigh Centurions which Kippax fell just short of winning. In the early 1980s, Kippax moved to the Longdike Lane facilities. This also saw the introduction of youth and junior teams, two England and Great Britain internationals, Danny Orr and Andy Lynch. During the early 2000s, Kippax Welfare played in the Pennine Leagues under ex-Hunslet player Andrew Atha. Ex-pros in Gateshead Thunder player Andy Walker and Featherstone Rovers duo Kieran Hickman and Dean Ripley helped the team become Division Three Champions in 2002–03, Division Two Champions in 2004–05 and Division One Champions in 2008–09. The team were Castleford Cup Champions as well in 2008–09. Atha was eventually replaced by a coaching team of David Jessey and Kippax Welfare and former Super League player Gavin Swinson. The Kippax 'A' (second) team won Pennine Division Six (Undefeated) coached by Neil Collins.

=== 2009–Present ===
In February 2009, the team was renamed Kippax Knights and they joined the Yorkshire Premier division of the Rugby League Conference. The Knights won the 2009 Yorkshire Premier Division in this first season, then they also went on to win the Grand Final, making it a double winning 2009 season. In 2010, Kippax were promoted to the National League. The 2011 season started with a first round date in the Challenge Cup against Loughborough University with the Knights narrowly losing. The Knights finished 2011 in the Grand Final at Halliwell Jones Stadium, losing to Huddersfield Underbank Rangers. The club joined the Yorkshire Men's League in 2013.

== Club honours ==
- RLC Yorkshire Premier League Winners: 2009
- RLC Yorkshire Premier Grand Final Winners: 2009
- Forty-20 Shield Winners: 2014
