= Liverpool Buccaneers =

English amateur rugby league club, based in West Derby, Merseyside

Coordinates: 53°25′41″N 2°53′43″W

- Jolly Roger

Club information
- Full name: Liverpool Buccaneers Rugby League Football Club
- Nickname(s): The Bucks
- Colours: Red and blue
- Founded: 2003; 22 years ago
- Website: liverpoolbuccaneers.co.uk

Current details
- Ground(s): Thornhead Lane, West Derby, Liverpool
- Competition: Rugby League Conference North West Premier

Liverpool Buccaneers Rugby League Football Club are an amateur rugby league club from West Derby in Liverpool, formed in 2003. The team played home games at Sefton RUFC in West Derby. They played in the North West Premier division of the Rugby League Conference, as well as the North West Merit League. They later played in the Co-operative Rugby League Conference.

As of 2010, the Liverpool Buccaneers were the only open-age rugby league club in Liverpool. In its early years, the team was made up of many local university students from John Moores University and Hope University. International players included Mark Webster, Al Stewart, and Ash Carroll who played for Scotland; Kieran Lacey and Daryl Lacey who played for England; and Kyle Graydon, John Luke Flanagan, and Keith Armstrong who played for Ireland.

== History ==
The team was formed in the winter of 2002. They joined the North West Division of the Rugby League Conference in 2003.

Their first victory in an away match was a 29–8 win against the Blackpool Sea Eagles.

In the 2006 season they won both the Cheshire Division, and subsequently went on to win the RLC Regional Grand Final. However, in the 2007 season they ended up top of the North West Division but narrowly lost to Widnes Saints in the Regional Grand Final.

Liverpool joined the Rugby League Conference National Division in 2008, and made the play-offs.

Liverpool Buccaneers withdrew from the National Division in 2010.

Many alumni of the Liverpool Buccaneers went on to play professional rugby for clubs including Blackpool, Doncaster, St. Helens, and Rochdale.

== Club honours ==
- RLC Regional Champions (National): 2006
- RLC Cheshire Division Champions: 2006
- RLC National play-offs: 2008

== Hall of fame ==
- 2008 – Mark Webster
- 2009 – Chris Chamberlain
- 2009 – Keiran Lacey
- 2009 – Tony Woods
- 2009 – Chris Lee
- 2009 – Mike Woods

== Coaching staff ==
- 2002–2003 Mike Rush (Head Coach)
- 2003–2005 Lee Addison (Head Coach)
- 2005–2005 Mark Yates (Head Coach)
- 2006–2010 Chris Chamberlain (Player / Head Coach)
