= Bramley Buffaloes =

English rugby league club

Club information
- Full name: Bramley Buffaloes; Rugby League Community Club
- Colours: Amber and black
- Founded: 2000; 26 years ago
- Website: bramleybuffs.com

Current details
- Ground: Redshaw Road
- Competition: Yorkshire Men's League

Uniforms
Home colours

The Bramley Buffaloes are an amateur rugby league club based in West Leeds, West Yorkshire, England.

The club was formed in 2000 following the demise of the original Bramley club that they are considered a continuation of.

== History ==
=== 2000–2004: foundations ===
At the end of the 1999 season Bramley RLFC resigned from the Northern Ford Premiership after years of financial issues. The club applied to rejoin the Northern Ford Premiership in 2000 with the intention of becoming a feeder club for Leeds Rhinos and playing home games at football club Farsley's Throstle Nest. However, they were rejected in favour of a bid from Gateshead Thunder.

A new supporter owned club was quickly formed and applied again the join the Northern Ford Premiership in 2001 which would have seen the club playing out of Farsley Celtics Throstle Nest stadium. However the RFL rejected the bid over the ground not meeting minimum standards.

The new club tried again to apply to play in the newly formed third division National League Two in 2003, this time sharing a ground with Morley Rugby Union Club. The club was once again rejected despite the ground meeting minimum standards; the RFL were unhappy the club was playing outside of Bramley. In the end, the RFL accepted the club into National League Three, the highest level of amateur rugby league, for the 2004 season.

=== 2004–2013: conference and success ===
Bramley's first game against Sheffield Hillsborough Hawks drew a crowd of more than 1,200 at Stanningley's Arther Miller Stadium. Coached by Phil Hellewell, the club reached the National League Three semi-finals, losing to eventual champions Coventry Bears. The following season the club finished second in the league and made the Grand Final, losing 28–26 to League Leaders Bradford Dudley Hill.

Ahead of the 2006 season, ex Bradford Bulls player, Paul Cook was appointed head coach. Under Cook Bramley finished the season as League Leaders and won the Grand Final, beating Hemel Stags 30–8. 2007 was another successful year for Bramley with club again finishing the season as League Leaders but were beaten by Featherstone Lions in the Grand Final.

The club again finished the season as League Leaders but failed to win the Grand Final in 2008, losing to Celtic Crusaders Colts. In November, Paul Cook left his post as head coach to take up an assistant coach role at Huddersfield. Mark Butterill was appointed head coach with Jon Nicholls being appointed assistant coach.

Bramley finished 2009 as League Leaders for a fourth year in a row and champions for a second time. 2010 was also a successful season with the club crowned League Leaders for a fifth time in a row but lost in the Grand Final to Warrington Wizards.

Butterill left the club at the end of the season and Peter Roe was appointed head coach for the 2011 season but left in April due to poor results. Australian Chris Gardner took over till the end of the season but could not prevent the club finishing bottom of the league.

In 2012 the amateur game aligned with the professional game by switching from playing in winter to summer. The Rugby League Conference was subsequently became absorbed into the National Conference League creating a fourth division, NCL Division Three. Bramley finished 5th in NCL Division 3 before losing in the Elimination Playoff to Warrington Wizards.

Bramley had to apply to the NCL to stay in the league for the following season however their application was rejected by the League and were instead entered the newly formed Yorkshire Men's League for the 2013 season.

=== 2013–present: Yorkshire Men's League ===
Steve Gill took charge of Bramley's first season in the Yorkshire Men's League. At the end of the season Bramley agreed a merger with local side Rodley Rockets. The merger would see Bramley retain their name, colours and heritage but they would play at Rodleys Canal Bank Ground and take on their junior teams in the hope of being able to apply to rejoin the NCL. initially the merger was a success with the Buffaloes winning the YML Premier Division, defeating West Hull in the Grand Final. Unfortunately the merger with Rodley only lasted 12 months after issues playing at Canal Bank meaning the club had to play on Stanningley Park and poor junior participation. In the aftermath of this a new junior club was set up in 2015, confusingly called Bramley RL despite having no links with the Buffaloes.

Despite a successful season the year previous, on 16 April 2015, the club announced that they had to pull out of the Yorkshire Men's League for the 2015 season, due to having no coach and a lack of players.

The club returned in 2016, playing in Bramley for the first time since 1995 having agreed with Bramley Phoenix Rugby Union Club to use their ground. The club were placed in Division 5 and appointed ex Hunslet and Carlisle player Steve Langton.

Midway through the 2021 season Bramley left Bramley Phoenix and moved to ground share with West Leeds RUFC.

== Honours ==
- Conference National Division: 2006, 2009
- Yorkshire Premier Division: 2014
- Yorkshire Division Two: 2016

== Seasons ==
Season	League										Cup	
Season	Division	P	W	D	L	F	A	Pts	Pos	Play-offs	Comp	Round
2004	National League Three	20	13	1	6	592	368	27	5th	SF		
2005	National League Three	18	16	0	2	832	237	32	2nd	RU	Challenge Cup	R1
2006	National League Three	16	14	0	2	606	240	26	1st	W	Challenge Cup	R2
2007	Conference National								1st		Challenge Cup	R1
2008	Conference National								1st		Challenge Cup	R2
2009	Conference National								1st	W		
2010	Conference National								1st	RU		
2011	Conference National											
2011	NCL Division Three	18	8	0	10	378	402	29	5th	Elimination Final		
2012	YML Premier Division											
2013	YML Premier Division											
2014	YML Premier Division									W		
2015	YML Premier Division											
2016	YML Premier Division											
2017	YML Division 2	8	6	0	2			12				
2018	YML Premier Division	14	4	0	10	268	349	6	7th	DNQ		
2019	YML Premier Division	Withdrew from league									YML Cup	RU
2021	YML Division 1	12	1	0	11	124	300	2	6th	DNQ		
2022	YML Division 1	14	7	0	7	240	240	12	5th	DNQ	YML Cup	SF
2023	YML Division 4A	14	10	1	3	546	236	21	1st	N/A	YML Shield	RU
2024	YML Division 3	14	12	0	2	507	138	24	1st	RU	YML Trophy	W
2025	YML Division 2	14	3	1	10	175	312	3	6th	DNQ	YML Trophy	GS
2026	YML Division 3	14	8	2	4	418	252	16	3rd		YML Trophy	R1

== Past coaches ==
Also see Category:Bramley Buffaloes coaches

- Phil Hellewell 2004–05
- Paul Cook 2006–08
- Mark Butterill 2009–10
- Peter Roe Jan 2011 – April 2011
- Chris Gardner April 2011
- Craig Lingard 2012
- Steve Gill 2013 – 2015
- Steve Langton 2016

== Grounds ==
- 2004-2013: Arthur Miller Stadium, Stanningley
- 2014: Canal Bank Ground, Rodley
- 2015: Stanningley Park
- 2016-2021: The Warrels, Bramley
- 2022-2025 : West Leeds Sport and Social Club, Wortley
- 2026- : Redshaw Road, Armley

== Records ==
=== Player records ===
- Most goals in a match: 13 by Paul Drake vs Coventry Bears, 24 April 2005
- Most points in a match: 36 by Paul Drake vs Underbank Rangers, 4 September 2005
- Most goals in a season: 146 by Paul Drake, 2005
- Most points in a season: 382 by Paul Drake, 2005

=== Club records ===
- Highest score for: 86–0 vs Essex Eels, 19 June 2005

== Bibliography ==
- Gateshead and Bramley sweat
- Bramley apply to rejoin RFL
