= Widnes Saints =

English amateur rugby league club

Widnes Saints ARLFC
Club information
- Full name: Widnes Saints Rugby League Club
- Founded: 2004; 22 years ago
- Website: www.widnessaints.com

Current details
- Ground: Heath Road, Widnes, Cheshire
- Competition: Rugby League Conference North West Premier

Widnes Saints are a rugby league team based in Widnes, Cheshire. They play in the North West Premier Division of the Rugby League Conference.

== History ==
Widnes Saints were formed in 2004 operating from the Widnes St Maries premises. The club joined the North West Division of the Rugby League Conference. The first season was a success with the Saints winning their Division and the Harry Jepson Trophy at their first attempt at the Conference Grand Final against West London Sharks.

After two relatively poor seasons the Saints turned things round with the use of some of youth players produced by Widnes St Maries blending with some of the more experienced players from around the borough.

The 2007 Season saw the Saints finish second in the North West Division behind Liverpool Buccaneers but the Saints managed to overturn them in the play-offs to win the division title. Wins against Edinburgh Eagles and Rossington Sharks saw the Saints reach their second Grand Final in four seasons. They defeated Bedford Tigers to lift the RLC Regional title.

The Saints stepped up to the newly created North West Premier Division for the 2009 season. They finished second in the table but were beaten 20–10 in the final by Lymm RL. Saints withdrew from the North West Premier Division in 2010.

== Club honours ==
- Harry Jepson Trophy: 2004
- RLC Regional: 2007
- RLC North West Division: 2004, 2007, 2008
