= North West Men's League =

- Founded: 2012
- Country: England
- Number of clubs: 56 (2025)
- Level on pyramid: 4
- Promotion to: National Conferences
- Domestic cup(s): NWML Cup; NWML Trophy; NWML Shield
- Current champions: Orrell St James (4th title)
- Website: www.rugby-league.com/competitions/community-leagues/north-west-mens-league
- Current: 2025

The North West Men's League is a summer rugby league competition for amateur teams in North West England. The competition was formed in 2012 after the RLC North West Premier folded.

== History ==
The North West Men's League comes from the merger of elements from two strands of rugby league: the British Amateur Rugby League Association and Rugby League Conference.

The British Amateur Rugby League Association (BARLA) was created in 1973 by a group of enthusiasts concerned about the dramatic disappearance of many amateur leagues and clubs. BARLA merged the Leigh, Manchester, St Helens, Warrington, Widnes and Wigan districts into a new North West Counties league and created an elite National Conference League, this saw a revitalisation of the game in heartland areas of the North West of England.

In contrast, the Rugby League Conference (RLC) was born in 1997 as the Southern Conference, a 10-team pilot league for teams in the South of England and English Midlands taking place in the summer time rather than the traditional winter season. It led to the creation of many new teams in non-traditional areas; the first North West team to join the new league were the Chester Wolves; more teams from the North West joined the following season and a Northern Division was set up with teams from the North West and the North Midlands. Following a big expansion to the Rugby League Conference in 2003, the North West got its own regional division.

By 2008, there were enough sides for a higher level North West Premier division to be created and in 2010, a North West Merit League was created out of existing merit leagues.

With the RLC growing rapidly, some BARLA sides chose to leave traditional winter leagues and join the summer-based RLC. However, in 2011, the National Conference League, voted to switch to a summer season and most of the reserve teams followed. There was a short season from September to November in 2011 with teams from British Amateur Rugby League Association league North West Counties league playing in two divisions under the name North West Men's League.

The Rugby League Conference was replaced in 2012 by a series of locally administered leagues. This saw the North West Men's League merge with the RLC North West Premier and regional divisions as well as the North West merit league to create a six division structure.

== Premier Division ==
| Season | Champion | Score | Runner-up |
|---|---|---|---|
| 2012 | Pilkington Recs | | |
| 2013 | Halton Simms Cross (1) | 26-19 | Widnes St Maries |
| 2014 | Widnes West Bank | 28-6 | Widnes St Maries |
| 2015 | Widnes West Bank | 28-16 | Clock Face Miners |
| 2016 | Haydock | 23-14 | Thatto Heath Crusaders A |
| 2017 | Thatto Heath Crusaders A | | |
| 2018 | Thatto Heath Crusaders A | 26-12 | Orrell St James |
| 2019 | West Bank Bears | 11-10 | Shevington Sharks |
| 2020 | Season cancelled (COVID-19) | | |
| 2021 | Orrell St James | N/A | Halton Farnworth Hornests |
| 2022 | Orrell St James | 10-6 | Ashton Bears |
| 2023 | Orrell St James | 16-2 | Ashton Bears |
| 2024 | Haresfinch | 14-4 | Orrell St James |
| 2025 | Orrell St James | 32-4 | Blackbrook |

== Division One ==
| Season | Champion | Score | Runner-up |
|---|---|---|---|
| 2012 | | | |
| 2013 | | | |
| 2014 | Bold Miners | 36-22 | Heysham Atoms |
| 2015 | Thatto Heath Crusaders A | 32-8 | Halton Simms Cross |
| 2016 | Orrell St James | 32-14 | Folly Lane |
| 2017 | | | |
| 2018 | Rochdale Mayfield A | 51-6 | Walney Central |
| 2019 | Blackbrook | 34-14 | Hindley |
| 2020 | Season cancelled (COVID-19) | | |
| 2021 | Latchford Albion | N/A | Dalton |
| 2022 | Haresfinch | 38-6 | Ulverston |
| 2023 | Folly Lane | 24-0 | Dalton |
| 2024 | Dalton | 38-16 | Westhoughton Lions |
| 2025 | Hindley | 40-4 | Chorley Panthers |

== Division Two ==
| Season | Champion | Score | Runner-up |
|---|---|---|---|
| 2012 | | | |
| 2013 | | | |
| 2014 | Wigan St Patricks A | 24-14 | Leigh Miners Rangers A |
| 2015 | Orrell St James | 20-18 | Golbourne Parkside |
| 2016 | Halton Farnsworth Hornets | 20-16 | Pilkington Recs A |
| 2017 | | | |
| 2018 | Wigan St Cuthberts | 28-18 | Ulverston |
| 2019 | Chorley Panthers | 60-2 | Langworthy Reds |
| 2020 | Season cancelled (COVID-19) | | |
| 2021 | Leigh Miners Rangers A | N/A | Folly Lane |
| 2022 | Wigan Spring View | 38-12 | Salford City Roosters |
| 2023 | Burtonwood Bridge | 22-6 | Ashton Bears A |
| 2024 | Hindpool Tigers | 34-10 | West Bank Bears |
| 2025 | Wigan St Judes A | 20-12 | Runcorn |

== Cup competitions ==
The North West Men's League also runs three tiers of cup competitions; the NWML Cup, Shield, and Trophy. Winners are:

| Year | Cup | Shield | Trophy | Ref. |
|---|---|---|---|---|
| 2024 | Haresfinch | Haydock Warriors | Bank Quay Bulls | |

== See also ==
- Yorkshire Mens League
- British rugby league system
- Rugby League Conference
