= Rugby League Conference =

Rugby league competition played in the summer in the UK

- Sport: Rugby league
- Formerly known as: Southern Conference League
- Instituted: 1997; 29 years ago
- Ceased: 2012; 14 years ago
- Number of teams: 115
- Countries: England; Scotland; Wales
- Champions: See list
- Website: rugbyleagueconference.co.uk

The Rugby League Conference, also known as the Co-operative Rugby League Conference as a result of sponsorship from The Co-operative Group), was a series of regionally based divisions of amateur rugby league teams spread throughout England, Scotland, and Wales.

The RLC was founded as the 10-team Southern Conference League in 1997, with teams from the southern midlands and the south east, but subsequently, rebranded and expanded both geographically and numerically to include around 90 teams stretched across almost the whole of Great Britain from Aberdeen in northern Scotland down to Plymouth on the south coast of England.

The aim of the RLC was initially to provide regular fixtures for new clubs based outside the traditional 'heartland' of rugby league in the UK, although as the playing standards increased, it also accepted teams from the 'heartlands'. The hope was that some clubs would eventually progress to become semi-professional.

To date, London Skolars and Coventry Bears both play in the professional structure as have Hemel Stags and Oxford although Hemel reverted to being a solely amateur club after selling its professional license to Cornwall and Oxford folded.

With the top heartlands amateur league, the National Conference League voting to move to a summer season, the 2012 season saw a re-alignment of the amateur game and the Rugby League Conference was replaced with a series of regional leagues.

== History ==
The Southern Conference League was founded as a 10-team competition in 1997. The following season it was rebranded as the Rugby League Conference due to its intentions to include teams from outside the traditional heartlands of Yorkshire, Lancashire and Cumbria.

The league steadily expanded over the first few seasons right up to the fringes of the heartlands, before expanding into Wales for the first time in 2001 with the addition of Cardiff Demons. The league expanded into the North East that same season.

In 2003 National League Three was founded including some of the stronger Rugby League Conference clubs and some BARLA clubs. This same season saw massive expansion of the Rugby League Conference including an entire Welsh division. The league also pushed its borders further including more teams from the less rugby league playing areas of the counties considered the heartlands and went as far south west as Somerset.

The league expanded further in 2004 by allowing entry to heartland clubs. For the 2005 season the competition was split into two tiers, with Premier divisions being created for above the existing regional divisions. The next major changes were in 2007 when National League Three (as the National Division) and the Scottish League became integral parts of the Rugby League Conference structure.

The Rugby League Conference celebrated passing the 100 club barrier in 2010.

2011 was the last season before the league was restructured.

== Representative fixtures ==
The Rugby League Amateur Four Nations was competition for national amateur sides from England, Scotland, Wales, and Ireland.

== System ==
Level	League								
1	National Division								
2	Midlands Premier		North-West Premier		Southern Premier		Welsh Premier	Yorkshire Premier	
3	East Regional	Midlands Regional	North-West Regional	Scotland Regional	South-East Regional	South-West Regional	Wales Regional	North-East Regional	Yorkshire Regional

== Past winners ==
=== Conference National ===
Year	Winners
2003	Woolston Rovers
2004	Coventry Bears
2005	Bradford Dudley Hill
2006	Bramley Buffaloes
2007	Featherstone Lions
2008	Crusaders Colts
2009	Bramley Buffaloes
2010	Warrington Wizards
2011	Huddersfield Underbank Rangers

=== Conference Premier ===
Competed for by winners of each premier division.

Year	Winners	Conference
1997	North London Skolars	Eastern
1998	Crawley Jets	Southern
1999	Chester Wolves	Northern
2000	Crawley Jets	Southern
2001	Teesside Steelers	North East
2002	Coventry Bears	Midlands
2003	Bridgend Blue Bulls	Welsh
2004	Widnes Saints	North West
2005	Bridgend Blue Bulls	Welsh
2006	South London Storm	London & South
2007	St Albans Centurions	Southern
2008	Nottingham Outlaws	Midlands
2009	West London Sharks	London & South
2010	St Albans Centurions	Southern
2011	Parkside Hawks	Yorkshire

=== Conference Regional ===
Competed for by winners of each regional division.

- 2005 Wetherby Bulldogs
- 2006 Liverpool Buccaneers
- 2007 Widnes Saints
- 2008 Moorends-Thorne Marauders
- 2009 Northampton Casuals (now Northampton Demons)
- 2010 Northampton Demons
- 2011 Elmbridge Eagles

=== Premier Divisions ===
==== Midlands Division ====
Year	Winners	
2001	Coventry Bears	
2002	Coventry Bears	
2003	Birmingham Bulldogs	
2004	North	Nottingham Outlaws
2004	South	Leicester Phoenix
2005	North	Thorne Marauders
2005	West	Wolverhampton Wizards
2006	North	Thorne Marauders
2006	West & South	Gloucestershire Warriors
2007	Coventry Bears	
2008	Nottingham Outlaws	
2009	Coventry Bears	
2010	Coventry Bears	
2011	Bristol Sonics	

==== North East ====
Year	Winners
2001	Teesside Steelers
2002	Teesside Steelers
2003	Leeds Akkies
2004	Newcastle Knights
2005	Durham Tigers
2006	
2007	
2008	
2009	Jarrow Vikings
2010	Jarrow Vikings
2011	Peterlee Pumas

==== North West ====
Year	Winners
1999	Chester Wolves
2000	Manchester Knights
2001	Rotherham Giants
2002	Manchester Knights
2003	Carlisle Centurions
2004	Widnes Saints
2005	Rochdale Spotland Rangers
2006	Carlisle Centurions
2007	Widnes Saints
2008	Widnes Saints
2009	Lymm
2010	Widnes West Bank
2011	Accrington & Leyland Bears

==== London & South ====
Year	Winners
1998	Crawley Jets
1999	Crawley Jets
2000	North London Skolars
2001	Crawley Jets
2002	North London Skolars
2003	Crawley Jets
2004	West London Sharks
2005	Kingston Warriors
2006	South London Storm
2007	St Albans Centurions
2008	West London Skolars
2009	West London Sharks
2010	St Albans Centurions
2011	Hammersmith Hills Hoists

==== Yorkshire ====
Year	Winners
2004	Leeds Akkies
2005	Wetherby Bulldogs
2006	Bridlington Bulls
2007	Rossington Sharks
2008	Bridlington Bulls
2009	Kippax Knights
2010	East Leeds
2011	Parkside Hawks

== See also ==
- British rugby league system
- Women's Rugby League Conference
