= Woolston Rovers =

English amateur rugby league club

Club information
- Full name: Woolston Rovers Rugby League Club
- Founded: 1959; 67 years ago
- Website: www.pitchero.com/clubs/woolstonroversrlfc

Current details
- Ground: Monk Sports Club, Two Point Lane, Woolston, Warrington, WA1 4NF
- Competition: NCL Division One

Woolston Rovers are a rugby league club based in Warrington. There are two open age teams at the club; the NCL team was in Division 1 of the National Conference League in 2025 and will compete in the newly formed National Conference North West in 2026 and the NWML team.

== History ==
=== Woolston Rovers ===
Woolston Rovers Rugby Club was founded at the Lido Country Club on Manchester Road, Woolston, Cheshire, in 1959. The first game played by the Woolston Rovers was against Cadishead in the 1960–61 season, with Woolston losing 58–8. Woolston had no pitch for the first two seasons and played all their games away from home. At the start of the third year, they acquired a pitch in Victoria Park, where they played until they moved to Bennetts Recreation Ground, Padgate.

The Jubilee Pavilion at Bennetts Recreation Ground was opened in 1978. Along with the clubhouse and changing facilities, Rovers had three playing pitches. These playing facilities were used in full when the junior section started in 1978. From 1978 up to 2002, Rovers had in excess of 10 teams per season.

Woolston Rovers were one of the original ten clubs invited to join BARLA's National League in 1986. This later became the National Conference League. In 1992, the Rovers were champions for the first three years and then runners-up for the next two.

In 2002, arsonists destroyed the Jubilee Pavilion and all the memorabilia within. With the club needing to rebuild, a summer club was set up under the name Warrington Woolston Rovers.

With only four junior teams remaining, a new committee formed in 2004 broke away from the open-age team's control. Calling themselves Woolston Rovers Juniors, they struggled to keep the remaining teams together.

Confusion between the Woolston Rovers and the summer team Warrington Woolston Rovers had led to the Woolston Rovers' winter team being relegated. They had won their league but failed to have a team entered for the 2004-5 season. The summer club then broke away and renamed themselves the Warrington Wizards. The Woolston Rovers were, allowed to rebuild their home ground.

At the end of the 2006 season, the Woolston Rovers committee decided to relaunch an open age team. An application to the North West Counties league was accepted, but Woolston Rovers had to start in Division 6. They were Division 6 champions in their first year. followed by finishing the next four seasons in the top two league positions to win back-to-back promotions.

=== Warrington Wizards ===
The Warrington Woolston Rovers was formed in 2003 to allow Woolston Rovers to rebuild at a local level following the fire that had destroyed their clubhouse. They played at Wilderspool Stadium and joined the newly formed National League Three. They beat the Teesside Steelers 42–6 in the final at Winnington Park to be crowned the inaugural champions.

In their second season of National League rugby, the Warrington Woolston Rovers finished the season in the third spot, defeating Bradford Dudley Hill in the play-off to make the Grand Final in Halton Stadium, Widnes, where they lost to Coventry Bears by 48–24.

At the end of that season, the summer Rugby League Conference team broke away from Woolston, changing their name to Warrington Wizards and adopting the colour purple.

The next five seasons saw the Wizards reach the play-offs on each occasion without making it to the Grand Final. The Wizards recorded a then record win of 108–0 over the Birmingham Bulldogs in June 2005, which was the first time that a hundred points had been scored on the ground. This was surpassed by Wizards when they defeated Cottingham Phoenix, 124–0 in May 2007.

2008 saw the Wizards miss out on the ‘Minor Premiership’ in the final game when they were narrowly beaten at eventual Grand Final winners Celtic Crusaders Colts, they were then defeated in the elimination semi-final play-off at home by Featherstone Lions. The Wizards had a successful run in the 2008 Challenge Cup with a first round away win at St Mary's University, Twickenham and then a home win over Stanningley in the second round which put them into the hat with the professionals in the third round where they drew Salford City Reds who beat them 66–10.

In 2010, the Wizards beat Huddersfield Underbank Rangers 23–18 in the Grand Final at the Halliwell Jones Stadium to win the Rugby League Conference National Division title. In 2011, the Wizards failed to make the play-offs for the first time.

=== Merger ===
The Warrington Wizards merged with the Woolston Rovers ahead of the 2013 season. They applied to join the National Conference League under the Woolston Rovers name, but they will compete as the Wizards in the 2013 Challenge Cup. By merging with Woolston Rovers, they joined the open age sector with the juniors to form the current club.

The Woolston Rovers, in their new home of Monk's Sports club, went from one open age team and three junior teams, to two open age teams and thirteen juniors ranging from cubs (5–6) to under 15's. Following the merger between the two teams, the junior section renamed themselves Woolston Rovers Wizards.

== Club honours ==
- Rugby League Conference National Division: 2003 (as National League 3), 2010
- NWC Development Plate Winners under 15s 2014
- NWC Development Cup Winners U12s 2014
- NWC Development Cup Winners U15s 2015

== Notable players ==
Great Britain internationals; Mark Forster played for Woolston Rovers in the 1980s, at the start of his career, Alan Rathbone and Ronnie Duane. Current Super League players Jumah Sambou of Hull KR, Oliver Polec of Leigh Leopards. Other Woolston Rovers alumni that played professionally were:

Blackpool: Warren Lathom, Mark Roughneen

Cardiff / South Wales: Neil Kelly, Clint Rylance, Stuart Cash, Mark Wallington

Chorley: John Donno, Lee Westwood

Halifax: Carl Dobson, Craig Boyle

London Broncos: Ade Spencer

Prescot Panthers: Clint Rylance, Neil Mawdsley, Mark Wallington

Rochdale: Joe Chamberlain, Terry Cochrane, George Snape, Tommy Hindley, Tony Cooke, Norman Williams, Vinny Webb

Salford: Steve Griffiths, Liam Horrigan, Warren Ayres (Jnr), Chris Mellor, Adam Files, Harry Files

Sheffield Eagles: Lynton Stott

Springfield Borough: Simon Bamber, Graham Smith, Mike Stewart

St Helens: Chris Morley

Swinton: Les Green, Danny Heaton

Trafford Borough: Paul Bigg, Andy Green

Villefranche de Rougerie: Neil Collinson, Paul Bigg, Mike Swift

Warrington: Colin Thackeray, Wayne Gaskill, Roy Pickersgill, Mark Forster, Ian Duane, Ron Duane, Alan Rathbone, Tony Thorniley, Andy Bennett, Paul Williamson, Paul Massey, John Thursfield, Mike Wainwright, Shaun Geritas, Mat Callon, Darren Geritas, Nick Owen, Craig Cornelia, Chris Riley, Paul Reynolds, Tyrone McCarthy, Connor Wrench

Widnes: Phil Halligan, Paul Houghton, Mike Briggs

Wigan: Scott Gandy

Workington Town: Pete Livett
