= Featherstone Lions =

English amateur rugby league club

Featherstone Lions ARLFC

Club information
- Full name: Featherstone Lions ARLFC
- Colours: Blue & White Butchers Stripe shirts and Navy shorts
- Founded: 1994; 32 years ago
- Website: https://www.featherstonelions.co.uk/

Current details
- Ground: Millpond Stadium
- Competition: NCL Division Three and YML NCL Aliance

Featherstone Lions are an amateur rugby league club from Featherstone, West Yorkshire who play in the National Conference League and the Yorkshire Men's League. The juniors (U7 - U18) play in the Yorkshire Junior & Youth League. The club also has open age women and 3 girls' teams.

Their home ground is the Millpond Stadium. They are the town's second side, after Featherstone Rovers who play in the Championship.

== History ==
Featherstone Lions are the result of a merger between Jubilee Hotel and Traveller's amateur sides in the early 1990s.

Featherstone's first season, 1994–95, was in the CMS Yorkshire league First Division. At the end of the 1995–96 season, they had won promotion to the Yorkshire League Premier Division and finished 2nd in the table.

They were accepted into National Conference League Division 2 for the 1996–97 season. In 1997–98, Featherstone Lions won promotion to NCL Division 1 as champions, won the Yorkshire Cup beating Siddal in a bad tempered final at Thrum Hall and beat Doncaster in the third round of the Challenge Cup before losing to Hull Kingston Rovers.

Featherstone reached the fourth round of the Challenge Cup, in 1998–99, after beating Hemel Stags before playing Super League side Halifax.

In 2000–01, Featherstone reached the National Cup Final before losing to Thatto Heath at Spotland Stadium, Rochdale.

The following year, the Lions narrowly avoided relegation but in 2002–03 were promoted to NCL Premier League. However, they were relegated back to NCL Division 1 in their first season and followed this with another relegation back down to NCL Division 2.

Following this double relegation, Featherstone withdrew from National Conference to rebuild the open age team. In 2006, they joined National League Three which they won a year later under its new name RLC National Division.

In 2024, their U-16 boys team became the first youth team globally to tour Serbia, losing 22–30 to the youth side of Red Star Belgrade and defeating Morava Cheetahs youth team 34–0.

== Juniors ==
Featherstone run a junior section in the Yorkshire Junior League with the following teams included:

Under 7s; Under 8s; Under 9s; Under 10s; Under 11s; Under 12s; Under 12 girls; Under 13s; Under 14s; Under 14 girls; Under 15s; Under 16s; Under 16 girls; Under 18s;

== Club honours ==
- NCL Division 1: 2016–Present
- NCL Division 2: 2015-2016
- RLC National Division: 2007

== Former players ==
- Richard Agar
- Tom Briscoe
- Jack Briscoe
- Joe Westerman
- Richard Owen
- Zak Hardaker
- Rob Burrow
- Liam Watts
- Richard Whiting
- Brett Ferres
- Danny Kirmond
- Josh Hardcastle
- Luke Briscoe
- Gareth Gale
- Jimmy Beckett
- Jack Townend
- Jamie Rooney
- Simon Tuffs
