= Yorkshire Men's League =

- Founded: 2012
- Country: England
- Number of clubs: 90 (2026)
- Level on pyramid: 4
- Promotion to: National Conference Yorkshire
- Domestic cup(s): YML Cup; YML Trophy; YML Shield; YML Plate
- Current champions: Doncaster Toll Bar (1st title)
- Current: 2025

The Yorkshire Men’s League is a summer rugby league competition for amateur teams in Yorkshire.

The competition was formed in 2012 after the Rugby League Conference Yorkshire Premier folded. The league was renamed to its current name following the 2012 restructure of amateur rugby league in Great Britain.

== History ==
Following the formation of the British Amateur Rugby League Association in 1973 clubs from local leagues in both Yorkshire and Lancashire formed the Pennine League. A solely based Yorkshire competition was not formed until 1978 when the CMS Yorkshire League was established.

Following the formation of the National Leagues in 2003, the Conference League South was expanded to include Northern clubs and renamed National League Three, becoming the highest level of amateur rugby league played in the summer. In 2008 National League Three was rebranded to the Rugby League Conference and expanded to include several regional competitions including the RLC Yorkshire Premier, which grew to three divisions.

Many clubs playing in the traditional winter leagues began to switch to the summer RLC, which contributed to its rapid growth. As a result of this, in 2011 the National Conference League, the largest winter league in the country, voted to switch to summer. Subsequently the RLC National Division became NCL Division Three in 2012.

Following the switch to summer the CMS Yorkshire League folded with clubs wanting to continue playing in winter joining the Pennine League. Yorkshire based clubs who wished to play summer rugby were entered into the newly formed Yorkshire Men's League.

== Structure ==
The Yorkshire Men's League currently runs seven divisions with promotion and relegation between them:

- Premier Division
- Division 1
- Division 2
- Division 3
- Division 4
- Division 5
- Division 6
- Division 7
- Entry Division
- Merit Division

== Clubs ==
=== Premier Division ===
- Brighouse Rangers
- Dodworth Miners
- Doncaster Toll Bar
- East Hull
- Hunslet ARLFC A
- Ossett Trinity Tigers
- Newcastle Lightning
- West Bowling A

=== Division 1 ===
- Birstall Victoria
- Emley Moor
- Seacroft Sharks
- Sharlston Rovers
- Upton
- Wibsey Warriors
- Wyke
- York Barbarians

=== Division 2 ===
- Castleford Panthers
- Cutsyke Raiders
- Dearne Valley Bulldogs
- Derby Elks
- Eastmoor Dragons
- Goole Vikings A
- Lindley St Josephs
- West Hull A

=== Division 3 ===
- Birkinshaw Bluedogs
- Bramley Buffaloes
- Dewsbury Moor A
- Drighlington A
- Moortown Mambas
- Oulton Raiders A
- Queensbury
- Underbank Rangers

=== Division 4 ===
- Batley ARLFC
- Hemsworth Dragons
- Keighley Albion A
- Kings Cross Park A
- Newsome Panthers A
- Ossett Trinity Tigers A
- Sherburn Bears
- Stanningley A

=== Division 5 ===
- Crigglestone All Blacks
- Farnley Falcons
- Harrogate Hawks
- Hull Wyke
- Methley Warriors
- New Earswick All Blacks
- Shaw Cross Sharks A
- York Acorn A

=== Division 6 ===
- Garforth Tigers
- Guiseley Rangers
- Knottingley Mustangs
- Milford A
- Moldgreen ARLFC
- Moorends Thorne Maroons
- Rycroft Hammers
- Sheffield Hawks

=== Division 7 ===
- Bentley A
- Boothtown Terriers
- Dewsbury Celtic A
- Featherstone Lions A
- Normanton Knights A
- Thornhill Trojans A
- Upton A
- York Barbarians A

=== Entry Division ===
- Clayton
- Dearne Valley Bulldogs A
- East Leeds A
- Heworth A
- Hull Knights
- Illingworth
- Lock Lane A
- Odsal Sedburgh
- Scarborough Pirates
- Skirlaugh Bulls A
- Stainland Stags
- Woodhouse Warriors

=== Merit Division ===
- Beverley A
- Bradford Dudley Hill A
- Dodworth Miners A
- Doncaster Toll Bar A
- Emley Moor A
- Hull Dockers A
- Kippax Welfare A
- Lindley St Josephs A
- Mirfield Spartans A
- Myton Warriors A
- Rotherham Forges
- Sharlston Rovers A
- Stanley Rangers A
- Wetherby Bulldogs

== Premier Division ==
Season	Champion	Score	Runner-up	Venue
2012	Fryston Warriors (1)			
2013	West Hull A (1)			
2014	Bramley Buffaloes (1)	30-22	West Hull A	Wheldon Road
2015	Sharlston Rovers (1)	62-32	Ovenden	Wheldon Road
2016	West Bowling (1)	26-18	Doncaster Toll Bar	Post Office Road
2017	Siddal Academy (1)	30-12	Beverley	Mount Pleasant
2018	Batley Boys (1)	11-10	Bentley	Post Office Road
2019	Bentley (1)	18-14	East Hull	Post Office Road
2020	Season cancelled due to COVID-19 pandemic			
2021	Siddal Academy (2)	N/A	Bentley	N/A
2022	Westgate Common (1)	20-16	Doncaster Toll Bar	Mount Pleasant
2023	Newsome Panthers (1)	20-18	Fryston Warriors	Horsfall Stadium
2024	Stanley Rangers A (1)	22-12	King Cross Park	Post Office Road
2025	Spartans (1)	32-4	King Cross Park	Mount Pleasant
2026	Doncaster Toll Bar	28-20	Ossett Trinty Tigers	Mount Pleasant

== Division 1 ==
Season	Champion	Score	Runner-up	Venue
2014	Scarborough Pirates	38-32	Hunslet Club Parkside A	Wheldon Road, Castleford
2015	Siddal Academy			Wheldon Road, Castleford
2016	Bentley		Featherstone Lions	Post Office Road, Featherstone
2017	Norland Sharks	33-20	New Earswick All Blacks	Mount Pleasant, Batley
2018	Heworth	30-16	Cutsyke Raiders	Post Office Road, Featherstone
2019	Elland	34-12	Brighouse Rangers	Post Office Road, Featherstone
2020	Season cancelled due to COVID-19 Pandemic			
2021	Westgate Common	N/A	Fryston Warriors	N/A
2022	Almondbury Spartans	14-6	Lindsey St Joseph’s	Post Office Road, Featherstone
2023	Stanley Rangers A	32-6	Keighley Albion	Horsfall Stadium, Bradford
2024	Siddal Academy	18-4	Mirfield	Post Office Road, Featherstone
2025	Kippax Welfare	18-4	Bradford Dudley Hill	Mount Pleasant, Batley
2026	Upton	34-12	York Barbarians	Mount Pleasant, Batley

== Division 2 ==
Season	Champion	Score	Runner-up	Venue
2014	Shaw Cross Sharks A	—		Wheldon Road, Castleford
2015	Shaw Cross Sharks A	—		Wheldon Road, Castleford
2016	Leeds Akkies	—	Keighley Albion	Post Office Road, Featherstone
2017	Bramley Buffaloes	29-20	Hull Wyke	Mount Pleasant, Batley
2018	West Hull A	26-22	King Cross Park	Post Office Road, Featherstone
2019	Wyke	28-18	Ossett Trinity	Post Office Road, Featherstone
2020	Season cancelled due to COVID-19 pandemic			
2021	Almondbury Spartans	N/A	Doncaster Toll Bar	N/A
2022	Newsome Panthers	34-6	Ossett Trinity	Mount Pleasant, Batley
2023	Bradford Dudley Hill	42-10	Wibsey Warriors	Horsfall Stadium
2024	Moldgreen	24-16	Seacroft Sharks	Post Office Road
2025	East Hull	18-10	Dodworth Miners	Mount Pleasant, Batley
2026	Eastmoor Dragons	36-30	West Hull A	Mount Pleasant, Batley

== Division 3 ==
Season	Champion	Score	Runner-up	Venue
2015	Knottingley Worms	—	—	—
2016	Hunslet Club Parkside A	—	—	—
2017	Cutsyke Raiders	—	—	—
2018	Brighouse Rangers	—	—	—
2019	Farnley Falcons		Moldgreen	
2020	Season cancelled due to Covid 19 Pandemic			
2021	Hunslet Club Parkside A	N/A	Greetland All Rounders	N/A
2022	Keighley Albion	34-18	Hull Wyke	Post Office Road
2023	Seacroft Sharks	22-14	Castleford Panthers	Horsfall Stadium
2024	Dodworth Miners	26-16	Bramley Buffaloes	Post Office Road
2025	Upton	20-18 (GP)	York Barbarians	Mount Pleasant, Batley
2026	Dewsbury Moor A	24-8	Queensbury	Mount Pleasant, Batley

== Division 4 ==
Season	Champions	Second	Third
2015	Lock Lane A		
2016	Birstall Victoria		
2017	Stainland Stags		
2018	Wyke	Crofton Sports	Dearne Valley Bulldogs
2019	Greetland All Rounders	Doncaster Toll Bar	Crofton Sports
2020	Season cancelled due to COVID-19 pandemic		
2021	Newsome Panthers	Kirkburton Cougars	Lock Lane A
2022	Stanley Rangers A	Kirkburton Cougars	Stanningley A
2023	League split into conferences		
2024	York Barbarians	West Craven Warriors	Goole Vikings
2025	Eastmoor Dragons A	Dearne Valley Bulldogs	Derby Elks
2026	Sherburn Bears	Stanningley A	Batley ARLFC

== Division 5 ==
Season	Champions	Second	Third
2016	Odsal Sedburgh		
2017	Eastmoor Dragons A		
2018	Farnley Falcons	Lindley St Joseph’s	Wetherby Bulldogs
2019	Dodworth Miners	Brotherton Bulldogs	Eastmoor Dragons A
2020	Season cancelled due to COVID-19 pandemic		
2021	Regionalised competition		
2022	Sherwood Wolfhunt	Seacroft Sharks	Birstall Victoria
2023	No Division 5		
2024	Lindley St Josephs	Dearne Valley Bulldogs	Derby Elks
2025	Moortown Mambas	Keighley Albion A	Batley ARLFC
2026	Hull Wyke	New Earswick All Blacks	Crigglestone All Blacks

== Division 6 ==
Season	Champions	Second	Third
2022	East Leeds A	Normanton Knights A	Shaw Cross Sharks A
2023	No Division 6		
2024	Moortown Mambas	Sharlston Rovers A	Keighley Albion A
2025	King Cross Park A	Ossett Trinity A	Crigglestone All Blacks
2026	Milford A	Moorends Thorne Marauders	Garforth Tigers

== Division 7 ==
Season	Champions	Second	Third
2026	Clayton	Boothtown Terriers	Woodhouse Warriors

== Cup Finals ==
=== YML Cup ===
Season	Winners	Score	Runners up	Venue
2017	New Earswick All Blacks	18-8	Oulton Raiders A	Heworth
2018	Competition cancelled			
2019	East Hull	23-16	Bramley Buffaloes	Victoria Pleasure Ground, Goole
2020	Season cancelled due to COVID-19 pandemic			
2022	Doncaster Toll Bar	26-10	Almonbury Spartans	Mount Pleasant, Batley
2023	Newsome Panthers	18-8	Keighley Albion	Post Office Road, Featherstone
2024	Doncaster Toll Bar	24-6	Mirfield	Mount Pleasant, Batley
2025	Newsome Panthers	10-6	Siddal A	Post Office Road, Featherstone
2026	Doncaster Toll Bar	34-18	Hunslet ARLFC A	Odsal Stadium, Bradford

=== YML Trophy ===
Season	Winners	Score	Runners up	Venue
2022	Newsome Panthers	20-16	Ossett Trinity Tigers	Mount Pleasant, Batley
2023	Bradford Dudley Hill	20-14	Greetland All Rounders	Post Office Road, Featherstone
2024	Bramley Buffaloes	22-16	Illingworth	Mount Pleasant, Batley
2025	East Hull	26-24	Upton	Post Office Road, Featherstone
2026	West Hull A	36-30	Castleford Panthers	Odsal Stadium, Bradford

=== YML Shield ===
Season	Winners	Score	Runners up	Venue
2022	Stanley Rangers A	30-6	Kirkburton Cougars	Mount Pleasant, Batley
2023	East Hull	20-14	Bramley Buffaloes	Post Office Road, Featherstone
2024	Oulton Raiders A	22-0	York Barbarians	Mount Pleasant, Batley
2025	Drighlington A	38-24	Lindley St Josephs	Post Office Road, Featherstone
2026	Sherburn Bears	26-18	Hull Wyke	Odsal Stadium, Bradford

=== YML Plate ===
Between 2023-2025, the YML Plate was known as the NCL Alliance Cup.

Season	Winners	Score	Runners up	Venue
2022	Castleford Panthers	34-6	Queensbury A	Mount Pleasant, Batley
2023	Hunslet ARLFC A	42-0	Normanton Knights A	Post Office Road, Featherstone
2024	West Bowling A	38-4	Heworth A	Mount Pleasant, Batley
2025	Hunslet ARLFC A	24-16	West Hull A	Post Office Road, Featherstone
2026	Milford A	40-8	Skirlaugh	Odsal Stadium, Bradford

== See also ==
- Cumbria Rugby League
- North West Men's League
- British rugby league system
