= Underbank Rangers =

English amateur rugby league club

Underbank Rangers RLFC

Club information
- Full name: Underbank Rangers RLFC
- Colours: Claret and gold
- Founded: 1884; 141 years ago

Current details
- Ground(s): The Cross Grounds, Dunford Road, Holmfirth, West Yorkshire, HD9 2RR
- Competition: Yorkshire Men's League

Underbank Rangers are a rugby league team based in Holmfirth near Huddersfield, West Yorkshire. They play in the Yorkshire Men's League. Underbank are the second oldest rugby league club in the world - but the longest running continuous rugby league club in the world (with the oldest having folded a few times)

== History ==
The club was founded in 1884. During the early 1900s Underbank launched the career of rugby league legend Harold Wagstaff who would go on to be the first name in the Rugby League's Hall of Fame.

A Holliday Cup and promotion double was achieved in 1981/82 when Neil Fox was player / coach, this was repeated by the more recent team of 2015 including the likes of Joe Bellas, Tom Stringer, Dayle King and Oliver Moorhouse.

Rangers struggled in the late 1980s and early 1990s, as the establishment of the rival Newsome club took its toll. However, the club achieved a two-year revival at the end of the 1992/93 season, culminating in winning the Holliday Cup and gaining promotion to the Pennine Premier Division.

Season 1999-2000 witnessed the Rangers finish second, their highest ever position, in the Pennine League Premier division. The following season, 2000–2001, again saw Rangers riding high in the Premier Division and top of the table at Christmas. However, the club suffered badly with the foot and mouth crisis, the ground was closed and the nomadic Rangers won only one of their last nine matches. The next couple of seasons witnessed the Rangers struggle and they could not maintain their Pennine Premier League status.

They were founder members of National League Three in 2003, in which they competed as Huddersfield Underbank Rangers. They went on to finish sixth out of the ten competing teams. Seasons 2004 to 2006 saw the team miss out on the play-offs.

The league was renamed Rugby League Conference National Division and came within the Rugby League Conference structure in 2007. Rangers improved and finished fifth and reached the play-offs before losing in the second round at Warrington Wizards. The team again finished fifth in 2008 exiting the competition in the first round of the play-offs after a defeat at Featherstone Lions.

They were among nine clubs invited to join the National Conference League for the 2013 season. They reverted to the original Underbank Rangers name.

In 2020 the club made it to the fourth round of the Challenge Cup for the first time, defeating Lock Lane, Distington and League 1 side West Wales Raiders in the first three rounds before losing to 5 times winners Bradford Bulls at Dewsbury.

The club withdrew from the National Conference League at the end of the 2021 season, and joined the Yorkshire Men's League.

== Club honours ==
- RLC National Division: 2011
