= Hillsborough Hawks =

English amateur rugby league club

Sheffield Hawks ARLFC (formerly Sheffield Hillsborough Hawks ARLFC)
- Hawk

Club information
- Full name: Sheffield Hawks ARLFC
- Colours: Black, yellow and red
- Founded: 1989; 37 years ago

Current details
- Ground: Parson Cross Park
- Competition: Yorkshire Juniors

Sheffield Hawks ARLFC is a rugby league club based in Sheffield, South Yorkshire, England. The Open Age team plays winter rugby in the Pennine League. They also field junior teams from age 6 up to 16.

The club has a strong junior setup, with teams at seven different age groups.

== History ==
The club was founded under the name “Junior Eagles” in 1989 as a first attempt to develop rugby league below professional level after the formation of the Sheffield Eagles in 1984. After three seasons without a base the club found a permanent home in the disused athletics stadium in Hillsborough Park. The Hillsborough Arena Sports Association was set up and began work on grant applications that was to reach fruition with a successful Sports Lottery grant in 1996.

After beginning with only junior teams, an Open Age team was created that began life in the Pennine League in 1993. After a difficult start the team got going and by 1998/9 they lost only one game in winning the League title under coaches and Eagles legends Mark Aston and Paul Broadbent. The club then entered the National Conference League (the most prestigious amateur competition in rugby league) but then in 2002 took the bold step of joining the newly created National League 3, switching from winter to summer rugby in the process. The club was a regular participant in the play-offs, but never reached the Grand Final. It also ran a second team in the summer, playing in the Rugby League Conference.

Another new development in 1994 saw the Sheffield's Women's RL team join the club, which by then had changed its name to Sheffield Hillsborough Eagles. In 1997 the Club changed its name to Sheffield Hillsborough Hawks to avoid confusion with the professional club in the media and with the public and in the following year its new facilities were opened at Hillsborough Sports Arena following a £750,000 Lottery grant and a total investment of a million pounds.

In May 2006 the club withdrew from National League 3 as many of the players who had formed the team were unavailable and it was felt that the remaining players would not be competitive at that level.

The club withdrew completely from summer rugby in 2007 after it announced that it would not be entering a team in the Rugby League Conference, enabling players to take a rest and focus on the winter Pennine League team.

On 3 March 2007, Hillsborough Hawks under-16s team broke the world record for “Most Tacklebags Tackled in an Hour,” with 18 players making over 3600 tackles between them. As a result of this, the team raised enough money to go on a groundbreaking tour to Serbia in early April 2007.

The Under 18's fielded a team in the Gillette National Youth League in 2010.

In 2007, the Men's open age team won Pennine League Division 5, and also the Pennine Supplementary Cup, with a victory over Thornton at Crown Flatt, Dewsbury. In 2010 they won promotion from Division 4, and in 2011 were promoted from Division 3 at the first attempt. The Hawks also won the South West Yorkshire Cup. However, in the summer of 2011, a number of key players left the club, and the Hawks elected to drop down two Divisions, to Pennine League Division 4, where it was felt the club would be more competitive. After a shaky start, Hawks finished third in Division 4, and lost in the final of the South West Yorkshire Cup, and at the end of the season it was announced that the Hawks were switching back to summer, to play in the new RFL Yorkshire Summer League.

In 2018, the Men's open age team entered the Yorkshire Men's League, however, failed to recruit enough players to fulfil the fixtures of the season. A 'dual registration' deal with Hemel Stags was entered into, forcing a number of the local players out of contention.
