= Bradford Dudley Hill =

English amateur rugby league club

Club information
- Full name: Bradford Dudley Hill; Rugby League Football Club
- Colours: Amber and blue
- Founded: 1948; 78 years ago
- Website: Official club website

Current details
- Ground: Neil Hunt Memorial Ground
- Competition: National Conference Yorkshire A

Bradford Dudley Hill RLFC is an amateur rugby league team based in Bradford, West Yorkshire. Originally formed after the First World War, the club was re-established in 1948.

== History ==
=== Early years ===
Established just after the First World War, Dudley Hill originally played on the old Bierley estate. They were led by rugby league player Stanley Brogden who, after his career as a stand-off with Leeds, Yorkshire and Great Britain, wanted to put something back into the grassroots of rugby league.

The club was disbanded prior to the Second World War, and was reformed in 1948, due to Les Brady, who was running the successful Bierley under 18 team at the time, Vincent Heslop and Danny Cullerton. Heslop advertised in the Telegraph & Argus for players and, together with players progressing from the Bierley under 18 team, the Dudley Hill open age team was formed. Funds were raised by various means, including a football buster and Bradford Northern forecast.

The first match played was at Queensbury, which Dudley Hill lost by over 50 points to nil, missing a free kick under the posts in the last few minutes. The first win of the season was at Prince Smith and Steels, four points to eight. One of the Dudley Hill Players broke his arm and Heslop, who had the only available transport, a former army wagon, had to stop playing to take him to hospital. As there was no insurance available, a collection was taken every week for injured players. At the end of the season, Dudley Hill finished just above Prince Smith and Steels, who were bottom of the league.

Various changing rooms were used during this period, but eventually the Imperial Hotel on Tong Street was used, where buckets of water were begged from the publican for washing. Eventually, a boiler and bath were installed, and washing facilities improved. Even so, players would often use the cottage baths at the entrance to Knowles Lane Recreation Ground.

For away matches, the players usually met outside sports shops in the centre of Bradford, and proceeded to the matches by public transport. Home matches were played on various grounds: Knowles Recreation Ground, Knowles Lane and Odsal Rec.

During the next few seasons with new players coming into the team from Bierley and other sources, better results were achieved and the foundations were laid to make Dudley Hill a force in amateur rugby league circles. The coach at this time was Frank Hodgson, who recruited key players that were to complement the sprinkling of talented young players at the club, among them 18-year-old Ian Dickinson, Ian Reed, Neil Margerison and Rudolph Francis.

=== Post war years ===
Mick Oldfield became the first Dudley Hill player to play for Yorkshire in the post-war period, Heslop was the first to progress to Bradford Northern and Richard Rudd the first international player. During the next few decades, a host of players followed Heslop and Oldfield, some ending up in the professional ranks and some playing amateur representative football for Bradford, Yorkshire, and Great Britain.

The British Amateur Rugby League Association (BARLA) was formed in 1973 and set up a new league to replace the existing local leagues. Dudley Hill had finished bottom in the Bradford leagues final season and so were placed in the new Pennine Leagues Third Division. In successive years, the club progressed through the leagues eventually reaching the Premier Division.

Even with improved results and a stronger team, it was not until 1979 that Dudley Hill won their first trophy as winners of the Bradford League seven-a-side competition.

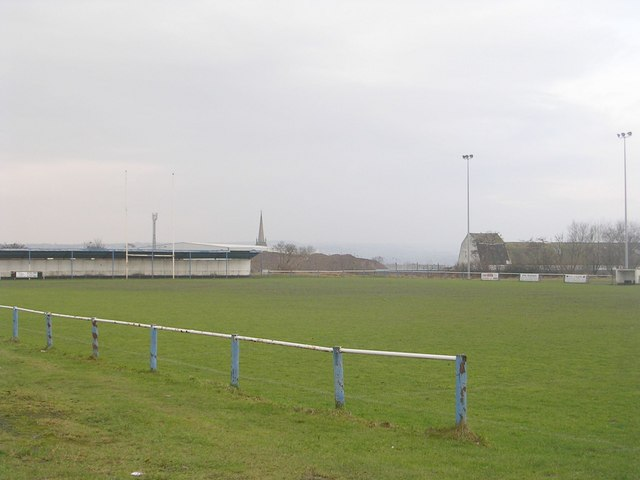
The club moved to Neil Hunt Memorial Ground, named after a 16-year-old player who died during a match, in 1979

On 1 September 1979 the club moved to the new Neil Hunt Memorial Ground, named after the 16 year old who died while playing for the club in 1976.

Between 1979 and 1992, Dudley Hill won every trophy available to them. Winning the BARLA National Cup, BARLA Yorkshire Cup, BARLA National Sevens, Pennine League Premier Division, Pennine Cup, Bradford Cup and numerous Sevens titles. In 1990 Dudley Hill won the National League title, and in 1991 were beaten in the BARLA National Cup final in Salford.

Dudley Hills success in the 80s meant they were chosen as one of the 12 clubs to be part of the new BARLA National League in 1993.

Success at youth and junior levels was the catalyst for setting up a youth and junior development programme, and 1987 saw the formation of a women's team, Dudley Hill Thunderbirds, who were inaugural members of the first Women's League, although they were subsequently disbanded due to funding difficulties. A grant of £75,000 meant that, in 1993, the clubhouse was extended and refurbished, new dressing rooms built, and floodlights installed.

Dudley Hill defeated professional opposition in the 1997 Challenge Cup, winning 21–14 in their third round match against York.

=== 2003–2006: National League Three ===
In 2003 Dudley Hill resigned from the National Conference League, traditionally playing in the winter, to take up a place in the newly formed National League Three who would be playing in the summer. The long-term plan was for National League Three to eventually have promotion to the professional National League Two.

Dudley Hill finished the first season as League Leaders but were defeated in the playoffs by eventual winner Woolston Rovers. The following year the club defeated Keighley Cougars (16–14) to reach the fourth round of the 2004 Challenge Cup and in the league they finished second but would again be beaten by Woolston Rovers in the playoffs. 2005 saw the club finish top and finally win the Grand Final, beating Bramley Buffaloes 28–26.

Despite some success in National League Three, the club resigned at the end of the 2006 season citing the lack of games due to teams forfeiting making it not financially viable to continue.

=== 2006–2016: Return to the NCL ===
After joining the National Conference League at the end of the 2005–06 season Dudley Hill were put into the NCL Division 2. Their 2006 Challenge Cup campaign saw them beat Gateshead Storm (42–12) and Warrington Wizards (22–20) before losing to semi-professional side Dewsbury Rams (0–68). During the 2006–07 season Dudley Hill won many games eventually being promoted with Saddleworth Rangers at the end of the year.

They managed to stay in Division 1 for the 2007–08 and the 2008–09 season. In their 2007 Challenge Cup run they beat Brighouse Rangers (42–4) before bowing out against Castleford Lock Lane (26–28). During the 2008 Challenge Cup, Dudley Hill beat Dewsbury Celtic (72–0) but lost to York Acorn (6–14) in Round 2. In the 2009–10 season they won promotion (again alongside Saddleworth Rangers) to the Premier Division. The 2009 Challenge Cup included a win against Halifax Irish (22–10) before being knocked out against Widnes St Maries (19–24). Dudley Hill's 2010 Challenge Cup run did not last long as they were knocked out in Round 1 by Castleford Panthers (18–20).

Bradford Dudley Hill only lasted one season in the Premier Division as they were relegated at the end of the 2010–11 season along with Wigan St Judes and York Acorn. The NCL decided to switch from player winter seasons to summer season and thus held an interim season in 2011. Meanwhile, in the 2011 Challenge Cup, Dudley Hill beat Kells (22–14) before losing narrowly to Fryston (12–16).

The 2012 Challenge Cup started well for Dudley Hill, they beat Castleford Panthers (38–0), Askam (52–12) and Leigh East (16–6). In Round 3 they were handed a profitable tie against Keighley Cougars who proved too strong for Dudley Hill (6–58). The 2012 NCL season saw Dudley Hill compete in Division 1, they were in the promotion places for much of the season but a few slip ups saw them finish 4th, just 1 point behind the top 3. They did however finish with the highest points difference.

Dudley Hill's 2013 Challenge Cup campaign started with a bye as the Bonymaen Broncos had to pull out due to player shortages. They beat Eastmoor Dragons (68–12) before losing in Round 1 to Leeds Metropolitan University (24–28). The 2013 season was a mixed season for Dudley Hill as the finished mid-table (7th) however they were unable to compete in a fixture against Rochdale Mayfield on the scheduled date due to player shortages and the club was fined and relegated. In addition to this the club suffered from financial problems which nearly put the club out of existence, however hard work was put into the club by various people and ensured that Dudley Hill survived. Due to the problems the club decided not to enter the 2014 Challenge Cup citing that they could not guarantee being in business when the competition commenced.

2014 saw the club compete in Division Two of the National Conference league. They had a mixed start to the season with some inconsistent form but they eventually put a run of 10 games unbeaten to nearly grab automatic promotion to be denied by a two-point deduction for fielding an ineligible player. Throughout the season Dudley Hill did the double over heavy favourites Pilkington Recs and also stealing a win against Elland. Eventually Dudley Hill finished 4th in the league and beat Ovenden (36–8) in the play-offs before losing in the play-off final to Pilkington Recs (10–28). In the Conference Challenge Trophy the team beat Division One opponents Saddleworth Rangers (20–18) before losing to Premier side Leigh Miner Rangers (18–42).

During the off-season hooker Nathan Kitson signed for semi-professional side Oxford Rugby League of the Kingstone Press League 1. Former player and ex Gloucestershire All Golds scrum half Danny Thomas took over the role of head coach.

Dudley Hill once again did not enter the Challenge Cup. Hill started the 2015 season with 5 consecutive losses followed by a heavy loss to West Hull (0–62) in the Conference Challenge Cup. Soon after this defeat coach Danny Thomas was sacked by the club and former coach and ex player Jason Lee took the reins. In his first game in charge Hill beat Dewsbury Celtic (42–24) who had just recently appointed Hill's ex coach Danny Thomas. After two big wins, Hill suffered three big losses before hammering Oldham St Annes (76–8) in the biggest winning margin of the season. An inconsistent end to the season saw Dudley Hill finish 7th in the league.

Hill started the season with four victories in a row including a season opening win against Stanley Rangers (38–10). However a defeat to Askham and a heavy loss in the Conference Challenge Cup to Rochdale Mayfield (6–54) dented their good start. Throughout the season Dudley Hill's form varied from match to match culminating in only winning 13 of their 22 matches in the league. Hill finished 7th and missed out on the playoffs by points difference.

=== 2023–2025: Yorkshire Men's League ===
In March 2023, the club announced it would be resigning from the National Conference League after being relegated from Division Two to join the Yorkshire Men's League. The decision was made after the club struggled to arrange postponed games to be played. Entering the Yorkshire Men's League in Division Two meant there were more local derbies and the club could focus more on junior teams.

=== 2026–Present: National Conference Yorkshire A ===
Since 2026, the club plays in the brand new RFL league - the National Conference Yorkshire A, following the RFL's reorganisation of the amateur game.

== Grounds ==
In 1979, Dudley Hill moved to a piece of land on the corner of Parry Lane and Lower Lane. The club named the ground the Neil Hunt Memorial Ground after a player who died during a game.

The ground contains a small covered stand behind one set off posts. There are changing rooms in one corner of the ground next to the club hose which is accessible from Lower Lane.

== Other teams ==
In 2012, in addition to the senior team, the club ran teams at six junior age levels, had a women's team, Dudley Hill Diamonds, and a team in the Pennine League Division 4.

== Honours ==
=== League ===
- National League Three:

Winners: 2005

- National Conference League:

Winners: 1990

- Pennine League First Division:

Winners: 1987

- Pennine League Second Division:

Winners: 1975–75

- Pennine League Third Division:

Winners: 1974–75

=== Cup ===
- BARLA National Cup:

Winners: 1984
Runners up: 1991

- BARLA Yorkshire Cup:

Winners: 1985–86
Runners up: 1990

- Pennine Cup Winners: 1980, 1986
- Bradford Cup Winners: 1984, 1985, 1986
- National Sevens Winners: 1985

== Notable players ==
The following is a list of Dudley Hill players who have also earned international caps during their careers:

- Simon Haughton – Represented England and Great Britain.
- John Bateman – Represented England and Great Britain.
- Craig Kopczak – Represented Wales.
- Dave Halley – Represented Wales.
- Jason Lee – Represented Wales.
- Danny Thomas – Represented Jamaica.
- Chad Bain – Represented Canada.

== See also ==
- Bradford Bulls Women
