= History of the Rugby League Conference =

The Rugby League Conference (RLC), also known as the Co-operative Rugby League Conference as a result of sponsorship from The Co-operative Group, was a series of regionally based divisions of amateur rugby league teams spread throughout England, Scotland and Wales.

It was founded in 1997 as the Southern Conference League.

== History ==
=== Background ===
In 1895, several clubs in the North of England broke away from the Rugby Football Union (RFU), the governing body of rugby football in England, over the issue of player expenses.

This led to the great schism which resulted in rugby becoming two separate sports: rugby union administered by the RFU and rugby league administered by the Rugby Football League as the two games evolved different sets of rules.

Although rugby league spread overseas, sanctions by the RFU made it more difficult for the sport to expand beyond its "heartlands" in the traditional counties of Yorkshire, Lancashire and Cumberland.

=== Earlier non-heartland competitions ===
Prior to the Rugby League Conference, there were several non-heartland leagues throughout England run by the British Amateur Rugby League Association (BARLA); the most recent ones being the London Amateur Rugby League, the Midlands and South West Amateur Rugby League Association (MASWARLA), the East Midlands Amateur Rugby League Association (EMARLA), the Eastern Counties Amateur Rugby League and the North Eastern Amateur Rugby League Association (NEARLA).

The Eastern Counties and the MASWARLA competitions folded in 1995 (as did the Welsh Amateur League of the time) The few remaining teams were absorbed by the London ARL and the EMARLA. The London League initially regionalised its division 2 to cope with the increased travel pressures this caused, but they were unable to keep up numbers for this. While their leagues at the time survived (albeit at a low level) teams in the North East of England and the East Midlands were looking at playing in Yorkshire-based heartland leagues. However teams in the South of England had no such option, London Skolars were even rejected from BARLA's National Conference League for the 1996–97 season.

A further major factor leading to the creation of the Southern Conference League was that the professional clubs had switched to a summer season the previous year and thus interest in the sport in the winter was decreased. The abandonment of amateurism by the rival sport of rugby union in 1995 meant that it was now possible for rugby union players to play rugby league during their off-season without risking a ban from rugby union whilst adding an element of competition for players in the winter. This gave non-heartland clubs a larger player pool but only if they switched to summer.

=== 1997 ===
The Southern Conference League began as a 10-team pilot league in 1997. The teams selected were not necessarily those with the highest playing standard, as off-field factors were initially considered very important. Furthermore, teams were selected to represent medium to large-sized towns and thus some clubs were considered undesirable, either due to being pub teams or due to being in small towns based too near a large town with a club (the latter being one of the reasons St Ives Roosters were outside the league until 2003).

The initial line-up was as follows:

- Central Division: Birmingham, Leicester Phoenix, Oxford Cavaliers, Reading Raiders, Worcester Royals
- Eastern Division: Bedford Swifts, Ipswich Rhinos, Kingston, North London Skolars, West London

Birmingham and Leicester Phoenix had been playing in the EMARLA (the former since the demise of the MASWARLA). Among the newly formed clubs were Bedford Swifts, the first ever cross-code club (i.e. playing both rugby union and rugby league), West London (formed from a merger of two of the more successful London ARL teams Brent-Ealing and London Colonials), Oxford Cavaliers and Worcester Royals (though the latter 2 had played friendlies the preceding summer). The other clubs joined from the London ARL including North London Skolars who were based on the student old boys network.

However, before the season started Reading Raiders announced that they would remain in the London ARL, the tenth place being offered to fellow London ARL club Cambridge Eagles, a club that missed out at the first stage of applications. As a result of Cambridge Eagles being more geographically suited to the Eastern Division, Bedford Swifts were switched to the Central Division.

Kingston were to resign from the league after only playing one game, but besides this and a forfeited semi-final this pilot season was generally successful, resulting in an increase of RFL funding to allow further expansion. North London Skolars were the winners of the first and only Southern Conference defeating Leicester Phoenix in the final.

The Scottish Conference was also founded in 1997 with five teams and had its first season. However, it would remain outside the Rugby League Conference structure until 2006.

=== 1998 ===
The newly renamed Rugby League Conference was founded in 1998 with 14 teams (initially planned to be 15, but the proposed Northampton club failed to materialise) with several new clubs resulting in a reorganisation of the divisional line-ups to three divisions (West, East and South). Of these new clubs St Albans Centurions had previously been playing in the London ARL and Cheltenham had had two clubs in the MASWARLA when that existed. Another new twist was the addition of the monikers of Super League clubs by many clubs, with Worcester becoming the Saints, Birmingham the Bulls and West London the Sharks; some Super League clubs also gave support to the new clubs.

North London Skolars joined the National Conference League after the first season, while retaining a team in the Rugby League Conference.

Initial line-ups as follows (new clubs in italics):

- Western Division: Birmingham Bulls, Cheltenham Warriors, Chester Wolves, Leicester Phoenix, Worcester Saints
- Eastern Division: Bedford Swifts, Cambridge Eagles, Ipswich Rhinos, Northampton (failed to start season), South Norfolk Saints
- Southern Division: Crawley Jets, North London Skolars, Oxford Cavaliers, St Albans Centurions, West London Sharks

In an all new team final Crawley Jets beat South Norfolk Saints at the Prince of Wales Stadium in Cheltenham.

=== 1999 ===
The 1999 season saw further expansion to 20 teams, resulting in another change in the divisional system. Initially only 15 clubs were to be funded by the RFL and Hemel Stags were admitted to the East division to fill the gap originally intended for Northampton the previous season after their Northern Ford Premiership application was rejected and the Alliance (reserve grade) was scrapped. However, a change of decision and the collapse of the EMARLA saw this changed. Derby City were welcomed as the final champions of the EMARLA and the other 4 new sides were formed from the ashes of defunct winter clubs. Worcester Saints became Worcestershire Saints after moving to Redditch in the first relocation. For the first time all starting teams finished the season.

Team line-ups as follows (new clubs in italics):

- Northern Division: Chester Wolves, Crewe Wolves, Derby City, Manchester Knights, Nottingham Outlaws
- Western Division: Birmingham Bulls, Cheltenham Warriors, Leicester Phoenix, Worcestershire Saints, Wolverhampton Wizards
- Eastern Division: Bedford Swifts, Cambridge Eagles, Hemel Stags, Ipswich Rhinos, South Norfolk Saints
- Southern Division: Crawley Jets, North London Skolars, Oxford Cavaliers, St Albans Centurions, West London Sharks

The title was won by Chester Wolves who defeated Crawley Jets in the final.

=== 2000 ===
This season saw a relatively modest further expansion to 24 teams, including the return of founder members Kingston. Leicester Phoenix's Chairman Julian Harrison was appointed the new Conference Administrator. This also coincided with the demise of the London ARL as a winter British Amateur Rugby League Association league but saw it reform as a summer based merit league with a combination of reserve teams and new clubs (though South London Storm and Kingston Warriors joined the Rugby League Conference). In a second relocation Cheltenham Warriors moved to Gloucester and became Gloucestershire Warriors. Another rebranding was by Birmingham Bulls, who became Birmingham Bulldogs to avoid a legal challenge by the Birmingham Bulls American football team.

This season also saw a test of summer rugby league in the North East of England, with a Northern Rugby League Summer Conference with teams from various BARLA leagues won by Teesside Steelers, also featuring Gateshead Panthers, Bridlington Bulls, West Craven Warriors and Wetherby Bulldogs.

Team line-ups as follows (new clubs in italics):

- Northern Division: Chester Wolves, Crewe Wolves, Derby City, Manchester Knights, Nottingham Outlaws, Rotherham Giants
- Western Division: Birmingham Bulldogs, Coventry Bears, Gloucestershire Warriors, Leicester Phoenix, Wolverhampton Wizards, Worcestershire Saints
- Eastern Division: Bedford Swifts, Cambridge Eagles, Hemel Stags, Ipswich Rhinos, South Norfolk Saints, St Albans Centurions
- Southern Division: Crawley Jets, Kingston Warriors, North London Skolars, Oxford Cavaliers, South London Storm, West London Sharks

The league was won by Crawley Jets who defeated Rotherham Giants in the final.

=== 2001 ===
The Conference expanded into Wales for the first time in 2001 when Cardiff Demons, who had formerly run a young team in the Academy competition, joined the league. Along with the new North East Division this left the Rugby League Conference with 30 teams in the 2001 season.

Initial line-ups as follows (new clubs in italics):

- North East Division: Bridlington Bulls, Gateshead Panthers, Newcastle Knights, Sunderland City, Teesside Steelers
- Northern Division: Chester Wolves, Crewe Wolves, Derby City, Manchester Knights, Rotherham Giants
- Midlands Division: Birmingham Bulldogs, Coventry Bears, Leicester Phoenix, Nottingham Outlaws, Wolverhampton Wizards
- South Central Division: Cardiff Demons, Gloucestershire Warriors, Hemel Stags, Oxford Cavaliers, Worcestershire Saints
- Eastern Division: Bedford Swifts, Cambridge Eagles, Ipswich Rhinos, South Norfolk Saints, St Albans Centurions
- London & South Division: Crawley Jets, Kingston Warriors, North London Skolars, South London Storm, West London Sharks

However, Gateshead Panthers merged into Newcastle Knights before the season started leaving a gap in the North East Division which was filled by Durham Phoenix, who after this one season returned to their former name of Durham Tigers.

Teesside beat Coventry Bears by a narrow margin in the grand final at Webb Ellis Road, Rugby.

=== 2002 ===
The competition for the first time remained at the same number of teams in the 2002 season, the only change being the addition of Luton Vipers from the London League to replace South Norfolk Saints who took a year out into that same competition. Plans to expand to Scotland with a Glasgow team in 2002 on the Cardiff model failed to materialise, and the Conference had to wait until 2007 to have Scottish full members for the first time. Another plan to expand to 32 teams with the addition of teams based in Bolton and Telford also fell through with Telford withdrawing their application.

This season saw a controversial format change, with two sets of three second round groups, both for the top three teams in each group but also for the bottom teams. These provided four extra fixtures, giving 14 guaranteed games, but the extra fixtures were poorly scheduled, seeing Manchester Knights eliminated despite winning all four extra games. This format was ditched after this season, though the idea of tiered competition was to return with the advent of premier divisions.

Team line-ups as follows (new club in italics):

- North East Division: Bridlington Bulls, Durham Tigers, Newcastle Knights, Sunderland City, Teesside Steelers
- Northern Division: Chester Wolves, Crewe Wolves, Derby City, Manchester Knights, Rotherham Giants
- Midlands Division: Birmingham Bulldogs, Coventry Bears, Leicester Phoenix, Nottingham Outlaws, Wolverhampton Wizards
- South Central Division: Cardiff Demons, Gloucestershire Warriors, Hemel Stags, Oxford Cavaliers, Worcestershire Saints
- Eastern Division: Bedford Swifts, Cambridge Eagles, Ipswich Rhinos, Luton Vipers, St Albans Centurions
- London & South Division: Crawley Jets, Kingston Warriors, North London Skolars, South London Storm, West London Sharks

In 2002 London Skolars were accepted into National League Two, from the following season the first club in over fifty years to make the transition from the amateur ranks to the professional leagues (the previous club to do so being Cardiff who unsuccessfully had stepped up from the Welsh League in 1951) and the first to step up successfully from a non-league competition since Castleford's elevation from the Yorkshire Senior League in 1926 (from which league Featherstone Rovers had also successfully stepped up a few years previously), though this league was theoretically semi-professional.

In September, last year's losing finalist Coventry Bears beat Hemel Stags in the grand final held at Cheltenham.

=== 2003 ===
Hemel Stags, St Albans Centurions, Coventry Bears, Manchester Knights, South London Storm (their position initially given to Crawley Jets, who later turned it down) and Teesside Steelers joined the newly formed National League Three in 2003, where they were joined by BARLA clubs Woolston Rovers (Warrington), Bradford Dudley Hill, Sheffield Hillsborough Hawks and Huddersfield Underbank Rangers. The inaugural winners were Woolston Rovers (Warrington) who defeated surprise finalists Teesside Steelers in the final.

The conference made the leap from 30 to 52 teams with the main growth areas being Wales and the North West of England, both of which gained their own division for the first time, but also in the South East with the addition of no fewer than 5 teams from the London League (North London Skolars 'A', South London Storm 'A', Greenwich Admirals, St Ives Roosters and the returning South Norfolk Saints). Also for the first time two teams further southwest than Gloucester participated: the Bristol Sonics and Somerset Vikings.

This rapid expansion was in part possible due to the lowering of the strict minimum criteria which were considered less necessary due to National League Three allowing a higher standard of play for the teams more suited to it. However, despite this, the only team to fail to complete the season was founder member Bedford Swifts. More controversial at the time was the inclusion in a development competition of Leeds Akademiks, a team based on the student old boys model very successfully used by the North London Skolars, in the largely rugby league free northern part of Leeds, but still nonetheless in a city known for rugby league. This was to pave the way for a huge influx of truly heartland teams the following season, drastically changing the face of the competition.

Team line-ups as follows (new clubs in italics):

- North East Division: Bridlington Bulls, Durham Tigers, Gateshead Storm, Leeds Akademiks, Newcastle Knights, Sunderland City, Whitley Bay Barbarians, Yorkshire Coast Tigers
- North West Division: Bolton Le Moors, Blackpool Sea Eagles, Carlisle Centurions, Chester Wolves, Lancaster, Liverpool Buccaneers
- North Midlands Division: Crewe Wolves, Derby City, Mansfield Storm, Nottingham Outlaws, Rotherham Giants, Worksop Sharks
- Midlands Division: Bedford Swifts, Birmingham Bulldogs, Coventry Bears 'A' , Leicester Phoenix, Telford Raiders, Wolverhampton Wizards
- South West Division: Bristol Sonics, Cardiff Demons, Gloucestershire Warriors, Oxford Cavaliers, Somerset Vikings, Worcestershire Saints
- Welsh Division: Aberavon Fighting Irish, Bridgend Blue Bulls, Cynon Valley Cougars, Rumney Rhinos, Swansea Bulls, Torfaen Tigers
- Eastern Division: Cambridge Eagles, Essex Eels, Ipswich Rhinos, Luton Vipers, South Norfolk Saints, St Ives Roosters
- London & South Division: Crawley Jets, Gosport & Fareham Vikings, Greenwich Admirals, Hemel Stags 'A', Kingston Warriors, North London Skolars 'A', South London Storm 'A', West London Sharks

Bedford Swifts failed to complete the season.

Bridgend Blue Bulls won the 2003 title defeating Carlisle Centurions in the final.

=== 2004 ===
The 2004 season saw Birmingham Bulldogs, Carlisle Centurions, Gateshead Storm (late replacements after Teesside Steelers surprisingly announced they were folding after being runners-up the previous season) and Essex Eels leave the Conference to join National League Three, which also gained the reformed Bramley Buffaloes. National league three was won by expansion club Coventry Bears, whose team featured professional rugby union players from Coventry RFC and Australian semi-pros including National Rugby League (NRL) reserve graders. They defeated Woolston Rovers (Warrington) 48–24 at Widnes Vikings' Halton Stadium, the first time the NL3 final had been held on the same bill as the other National League finals.

This season saw major expansion in the heartlands resulting in new Yorkshire and Cumbria divisions. The decision to include them has been much criticised, especially since many (though by no means all) are uncommitted to summer rugby league, seeing British Amateur Rugby League Association as their priority. However, only through the inclusion of heartland teams was it possible to create some of the premier divisions the following season, and a few of the heartland clubs were needed by National League Three over the years to keep it going when teams resigned from it. Furthermore, allowing heartland teams in meant all National League Three teams could run a reserve team in the summer if they so chose

Unlike the previous season only one team (St Albans Centurions 'A') was admitted from the London ARL.

Initial line-ups as follows (new clubs in italics):

- North East Division: Durham Tigers, Jarrow Vikings, Newcastle Knights, Peterlee Pumas, Sunderland City, Whitley Bay Barbarians, Yorkshire Coast Tigers
- Yorkshire Division: Bradford Dudley Hill 'A', Bridlington Bulls, Huddersfield Underbank Rangers 'A', Hull Phoenix, Leeds Akademiks, South Wakefield Sharks, Thorne Moor Marauders, Wetherby Bulldogs
- Cumbrian Division: Barrow Shipbuilders, Carlisle Centurions 'A', Copeland Athletic, Penrith Pumas, West Cumbria Crusaders
- North West Division: Bolton Le Moors, Blackpool Sea Eagles, Chester Wolves, Crewe Wolves, Lancaster, Liverpool Buccaneers, North Wales Coasters, Widnes Saints
- North Midlands Division: Derby City, Mansfield Storm, Nottingham Outlaws, Rotherham Giants, Sheffield Hillsborough Hawks 'A' , Worksop Sharks
- South Midlands Division: Birmingham Bulldogs 'A', Coventry Bears 'A', Leicester Phoenix, Rugby Raiders, St Albans Centurions 'A' , Wolverhampton Wizards
- Western Division: Bristol Sonics, Gloucestershire Warriors, Oxford Cavaliers, Somerset Vikings, Telford Raiders, Worcestershire Saints
- Welsh Division: Aberavon Fighting Irish, Bridgend Blue Bulls, Cardiff Demons, Swansea Valley Miners, Torfaen Tigers, Newport Titans, Valley Cougars
- Eastern Division: Cambridge Eagles, Hemel Stags 'A', Ipswich Rhinos, Luton Vipers, Middlesex Lions, North London Skolars ('A'), South Norfolk Saints, St Ives Roosters
- South Division: Crawley Jets, Gosport & Fareham Vikings, Greenwich Admirals, Kingston Warriors, South London Storm 'A', West London Sharks

The start of the season was marred by the withdrawal of twice former champions Crawley Jets, whose proposed replacements Reigate Crusaders never materialised. The only team to withdraw mid-season was Carlisle Centurions 'A', the last time this number was so few.

New team Widnes Saints defeated West London Sharks in the final.

=== 2005 ===
In 2005 National League Three changed from a period of expansion to one of consolidation, with both Manchester Knights (who had failed to complete their last few games the previous season) and South London Storm both deciding to enter the new Premier Divisions, though in fact Manchester Knights would only last two games before folding, with their position taken over by former BARLA club Dewsbury Celtic who saw summer as their future. In fact the National League Three season saw both Carlisle Centurions and Birmingham Bulldogs fail to complete the season (Birmingham took over their reserve teams' fixtures) showing that the expansionist bubble had seemingly burst with Bradford Dudley Hill defeating Bramley Buffaloes in an all-heartland final and both Coventry Bears and Essex Eels resigning at the end of the season.

The RLC Premier divisions were set up in 2005 to include the stronger teams in those areas who were able to travel further to play away games. The North and Central divisions were largely dominated by heartland teams that had been part of the influx the previous two seasons, the former of which incorporated all remaining Cumbrian division teams, while the Welsh Premier Division was the same teams as the regional division en masse promoted in status for pragmatic reasons. The South Premier offered the best hope for expanding rugby league into new areas.

New teams Redditch Ravens and Scarborough Pirates were formed from the ashes of the Worcestershire Saints and Yorkshire Coast Tigers clubs respectively. Leeds Akademiks had to change their moniker to the Akkies due to a legal challenge from an American clothing brand named Akademik. The ever fruitful London League provided three more teams this year: Bedford Tigers (formed the previous year from the ashes of Bedford Swifts), Haringey Hornets (effectively London Skolars' third team) and Luton Vipers 'A'.

Initial line-ups as follows (new clubs in italics):

- North Premier Division: Copeland Athletic, Jarrow Vikings, Penrith Pumas, Peterlee Pumas, Sunderland City, West Cumbria Crusaders,
- Central Premier Division: Bolton Le Moors, Hull Phoenix, Leeds Akkies, Manchester Knights, Nottingham Outlaws, Telford Raiders
- South Premier Division: Greenwich Admirals, Ipswich Rhinos, London Skolars 'A', Luton Vipers, South London Storm, West London Sharks
- Welsh Premier Division: Aberavon Fighting Irish, Bridgend Blue Bulls, Cardiff Demons, Newport Titans, Swansea Valley Miners, Torfaen Tigers, Valley Cougars
- North East Division: Catterick Panthers, Durham Tigers, Newcastle Knights, Scarborough Pirates,, Whitley Bay Barbarians, Winlaton Vulcans
- Yorkshire Division: Bradford Dudley Hill 'A', Bramley Buffaloes 'A', Bridlington Bulls, Huddersfield Underbank Rangers 'A', Hull Phoenix 'A' , Leeds Akkies 'A', South Wakefield Sharks, Wetherby Bulldogs
- North West Division: Blackpool Sea Eagles, Chester Wolves, Crewe Wolves, Lancaster, Liverpool Buccaneers, North Wales Coasters, Ormskirk Heelers, Runcorn Vikings, Warrington Wizards 'A', Widnes Saints
- North Midlands Division: Derby City, Lincoln City Knights, Mansfield Storm, Rotherham Giants, Sheffield Hillsborough Hawks 'A', Thorne Moor Marauders, Worksop Sharks
- West Midlands Division: Birmingham Bulldogs ('A'), Coventry Bears 'A', Leicester Phoenix, Redditch Ravens, Rugby Raiders, Wolverhampton Wizards
- South West Division: Bristol Sonics, Gloucestershire Warriors, Oxford Cavaliers, Plymouth, Somerset Vikings, Thames Valley
- Eastern Division: Bedford Tigers, Cambridge Eagles, Luton Vipers 'A' , South Norfolk Saints, St Albans Centurions 'A', St Ives Roosters
- London & South Division: Gosport & Fareham Vikings, Haringey Hornets, Hemel Stags 'A', Kingston Warriors, Middlesex Lions, South London Storm 'A'

It was felt that this season saw too many unstable teams admitted to make up the gaps left by teams joining the Premier Division. This was supported by the unprecedented number of midseason withdrawals, though a couple of these were more due to the increasing standards created by the influx of heartland teams. Aside from the aforementioned NL3 withdrawals and Manchester's replacement by Dewsbury Celtic in the Premier Division there were many Regional Division withdrawals. This started with the pre-season withdrawal of Lancaster (replaced by Rochdale Spotland Rangers), Chester Wolves (replaced by Wigan & Leigh Cavaliers), Rugby Raiders and Thames Valley. This continued with mid-season withdrawals of Oxford Cavaliers (who were to return), Luton Vipers 'A', Middlesex Lions, Gosport & Fareham Vikings and most surprisingly Rotherham Giants.

The Premier divisions saw Bridgend Blue Bulls defeat Leeds Akkies in the final, while Wetherby Bulldogs defeated Gloucestershire Warriors in the regional final.

=== 2006 ===
The 2006 season saw Coventry Bears and Essex Eels return to the RLC structure in the Midlands and Premier South Divisions respectively. Their NL3 places were taken by the promoted Dewsbury Celtic and Featherstone Lions, who had recently resigned from the BARLA National Conference League. Though Sheffield Hillsborough Hawks soon resigned from NL3 leaving their reserves as their first team.

The Premier divisions saw a change in boundaries leaving the North Premier division covering a larger area to give the English Midlands clubs their own premier division without having to face heartland teams, though this left the West Midlands division with too few teams to run, forcing it into a merger with the South West division. The Welsh premier division was split into two divisions, though this decision was reversed for the following season.

The London League provided three more clubs in Broadstairs Bulldogs, Kent Ravens and Colchester Romans. Two further relocations were Bolton Le Moors moving to Darwen to become East Lancashire Lions and Hull Phoenix moving to Cottingham. Furthermore, London Skolars 'A' had a one-season rebrand as Haringey Hornets, leaving the regional team of that name to become their reserves. The new Chester Wolves team were unconnected to the former team and in fact a summer team for Widnes-based BARLA club West Bank Bears.

Initial line-ups as follows (new clubs in italics):

- North Premier Division: Blackpool Sea Eagles, Cottingham Phoenix, East Lancashire Lions, Huddersfield Sharks, Leeds Akkies, West Cumbria Crusaders, Widnes Saints
- Midlands Premier Division: Birmingham Bulldogs, Coventry Bears, Derby City, Nottingham Outlaws, Leicester Phoenix, Telford Raiders, Wolverhampton Wizards
- South Premier Division: Essex Eels, Haringey Hornets, Ipswich Rhinos, Kingston Warriors, Luton Vipers, South London Storm, West London Sharks
- Welsh Premier Division (East): Blackwood Bulldogs, Cardiff Demons, Newport Titans, Torfaen Tigers, Valley Cougars
- Welsh Premier Division (West): Aberavon Fighting Irish, Bridgend Blue Bulls, Pembrokeshire Panthers, Swansea Valley Miners, West Wales Sharks
- North Division: Carlisle, Copeland Athletic, Jarrow Vikings, Peterlee Pumas, Sunderland Nissan
- North East Division: Catterick Panthers, Durham Tigers, Newcastle Knights, Whitley Bay Barbarians, Winlaton Vulcans
- Yorkshire Division: Bramley Buffaloes 'A', Bridlington Bulls, Huddersfield Underbank Rangers 'A', Leeds Akkies 'A', Ossett Trinity, Scarborough Pirates,
- Cheshire Division: Chester Wolves, Crewe Wolves, Liverpool Buccaneers, North Wales Coasters, Ormskirk Heelers, Runcorn Vikings, Warrington Wizards 'A', Winnington Park
- North Midlands & South Yorkshire Division: Lincoln City Knights, Mansfield Storm, Sheffield Hillsborough Hawks ('A'), Thorne Moor Marauders, Worksop Sharks
- West Midlands and South West Division: Bristol Sonics, Burntwood Barbarians, Coventry Bears 'A', Gloucestershire Warriors, Oxford Cavaliers, Plymouth, Redditch Ravens, Somerset Vikings
- Eastern Division: Bedford Tigers, Cambridge Eagles, Colchester Romans, Northampton, South Norfolk Saints, St Ives Roosters
- South East Division: Broadstairs Bulldogs, Greenwich Admirals, Haringey Hornets 'A', Hemel Stags 'A', Kent Ravens, St Albans Centurions 'A'

As with the previous season there were many drop-outs with Winlaton Vulcans (replaced by Gateshead Storm 'A'), Pembrokeshire Panthers and Northampton failing to make the starting gate and West Cumbria Crusaders, Huddersfield Sharks, Luton Vipers, Essex Eels, Catterick Panthers and Mansfield Storm subsequently resigned. Also while they withdrew before the fixtures were finalised South Wakefield Sharks were expected to play in the North Midlands & South Yorkshire division. Furthermore, Haringey Hornets 'A' were allowed to remain in the competition despite scratching 7 out of their 10 fixtures. However, unlike the previous season the withdrawals were less to do with unsuitable teams being let into the regionals and more to do with regional division standard teams being forced into the premier divisions to make up the numbers there.

The 2006 Premier division saw South London defeat East Lancashire in the final, while Liverpool beat Thorne Moor in the regionals final.

In 2006 a new league was founded as a feeder league to the RLC in the Midlands and South Yorkshire. The Midlands RL Merit League (now known as RL Merit League) was based on the principles of the successful London League and consisted of new clubs who are not ready for the full commitment of the Conference season together with RLC clubs' 'A' teams.

The Rugby League Conference provided administrative and promotional support to the Scottish Conference as a pilot scheme with a view to integrating the Scottish league as a full part of the Conference for the 2007 season. The six teams being Glasgow Bulls, Easterhouse Panthers, Paisley Hurricanes, Edinburgh Eagles, Fife Lions and Moray Eels.

Gloucestershire Warriors became the first Conference side to beat a 'traditional' amateur side when they beat Pennine League team Illingworth 25–24 away from home in the 2006 Challenge Cup. South London Storm were crowned RLC National Champions after beating East Lancashire Lions 30–0 in the final at Broadstreet RUFC.

=== 2007 ===
The 2007 season also saw a new sponsor for the league with Totalrlc being replaced by United Co-operatives in a six figure deal. Following United's merger with the larger The Co-operative Group, the league was named the Co-operative Rugby League Conference for sponsorship purposes.

In 2007, Bradford Dudley Hill withdrew from National League Three to return to the National Conference League and St Albans Centurions decided to join the RLC Premier South. Hemel Stags were left as the only southern team and National League Three was absorbed into the Rugby League Conference as the Rugby League Conference National Division with the addition of three teams from the Premier North Division: Leeds Akkies, Cottingham Phoenix and East Lancashire Lions. Cottingham Phoenix were subsequently expelled about halfway through the season for forfeiting three fixtures. The inaugural RLC National Division was won by Featherstone Lions who defeated Bramley Buffaloes in the final.

The promotion of three teams to the RLC National left the already depleted Premier North unviable and an artificial North Premier was created out of the North East and North regional divisions so that a league of this name could still exist.

The Midlands Premier Division gained Gloucestershire and Somerset in place of struggling Wolverhampton, who returned to the regionals. This season was a new South West division created for teams from the deep South West. While this was rather artificially created it was necessary due to the unique circumstances of the region to reduce travelling costs for what are ultimately amateur clubs. There was also already local interest for more teams, but intervention was needed to make sure this was a full division.

For the first time in several years no London League teams were promoted, but Farnborough Falcons and London Griffins had intended to enter before receiving call-ups (to form the short lived South Division intended to replace the failed South East division) and still played a small number of fixtures in it. The Midlands Merit League produced new club South Humber Rabbitohs and also helped provide Scunthorpe Barbarians partly based on former MML club Scunthorpe Braves. Aberavon Fighting Irish rebranded as Neath Port Talbot Steelers and South Norfolk Saints as Thetford Titans. Worksop Sharks relocated to Rossington, Doncaster controversially as Doncaster already had a team - Thorne Moor Marauders and this broke the one club, one town policy theoretically in place. Thorne Moor Marauders merged with BARLA club Moorends to become the Moorends & Thorne Marauders.

The Scottish affiliated division of 2006 became a full member division with all six teams admitted, though Glasgow never completed the season.

Initial line-ups as follows (new clubs in italics):

- National Division: Bramley Buffaloes, Cottingham Phoenix, Dewsbury Celtic, East Lancashire Lions, Featherstone Lions, Gateshead Storm, Hemel Stags, Huddersfield Underbank Rangers, Leeds Akkies, Warrington Wizards
- North Premier Division: Billingham Lions, Carlisle, Copeland Athletic, Durham Tigers, Gateshead Storm 'A', Jarrow Vikings, Newcastle Knights, Peterlee Pumas, Sunderland Nissan, Whitley Bay Barbarians
- Midlands Premier Division: Birmingham Bulldogs, Coventry Bears, Derby City, Gloucestershire Warriors, Leicester Phoenix, Nottingham Outlaws, Somerset Vikings, Telford Raiders
- South Premier Division: Ipswich Rhinos, Kent Ravens, Kingston Warriors, London Skolars 'A', South London Storm, St Albans Centurions, West London Sharks
- Welsh Premier Division: Blackwood Bulldogs, Bridgend Blue Bulls, Cardiff Demons, Newport Titans, Neath Port Talbot Steelers, Torfaen Tigers, Valley Cougars, West Wales Sharks
- Yorkshire & Lincolnshire Division: Bridlington Bulls, Leeds Akkies 'A', Lincoln City Knights, Moorends & Thorne Marauders, Rossington Sharks, Scarborough Pirates, Scunthorpe Barbarians, South Humber Rabbitohs
- North West Division: Blackpool Sea Eagles, Liverpool Buccaneers, Ormskirk Heelers, Warrington Wizards 'A', Widnes Saints
- Cheshire Division: Crewe Wolves, Macclesfield Titans, North Wales Coasters, Runcorn, Winnington Park
- West Midlands Division: Bristol Sonics, Burntwood Barbarians, Coventry Bears 'A', Oxford Cavaliers, Redditch Ravens, Wolverhampton Wizards
- South West Division: Devon Sharks, East Devon Eagles, Exeter Centurions, Plymouth Titans, Somerset Vikings 'A'
- Eastern Division: Bedford Tigers, Cambridge Eagles, Colchester Romans, Greenwich Admirals, St Ives Roosters, Thetford Titans
- South Division: Broadstairs Bulldogs, Farnborough Falcons, Finchley, Gosport & Fareham Vikings
- Scottish Division: Easterhouse Panthers, Edinburgh Eagles, Fife Lions, Glasgow Bulls, Moray Eels, Paisley Hurricanes

Broadstairs Bulldogs failed to start the season and were replaced by London Griffins. Cottingham Phoenix, Gateshead Storm 'A', Ormskirk Heelers, North Wales Coasters and Glasgow Bulls all failed to complete the season, which while less than in the previous two seasons was still far from ideal, especially in the North West and Cheshire divisions which were both left with just four teams.

The Premier division was won by St Albans Centurions who defeated Coventry Bears in the final. The Regional division was won by Widnes Saints who defeated Bedford Tigers in the final.

=== 2008 ===
The RLC National in 2008 saw Leeds Akkies drop to the Premier North but the addition of a Colts team to professional club Crusaders and the double promotion of Liverpool Buccaneers to the National Division. Also notably for the first time no RLC National clubs ran a reserve team in the RLC, in fact Hemel were the only club to run one at all, in the London League.

There were multiple rebrandings: Crewe Wolves became Lymm Wolves, Winnington Park became Northwich Stags, the returning North Wales Coasters became Rhyl Coasters, Kingston Warriors became Elmbridge and Gosport & Fareham Vikings became Portsmouth Navy Seahawks.

The Midlands Merit League, renamed RL Merit League this season, produced East Riding and Sheffield Forgers for the Conference but South Humber Rabbitohs stepped back down. The London League provided Northampton Casuals and Hainault Bulldogs but regained London Griffins and Farnborough Falcons with the scrapping of the unviable South Division. 2008 also the saw the creation of the Women's Rugby League Conference.

Initial line-ups as follows (new clubs in italics):

- National Division: Bramley Buffaloes, Celtic Crusaders Colts, Dewsbury Celtic, East Lancashire Lions, Featherstone Lions, Gateshead Storm, Hemel Stags, Huddersfield Underbank Rangers, Liverpool Buccaneers, Warrington Wizards
- North Premier Division: Carlisle Centurions, Durham Tigers, Jarrow Vikings, Leeds Akkies, Newcastle Knights, Peterlee Pumas, Sunderland Nissan, Whitley Bay Barbarians
- Midlands Premier Division: Bedford Tigers, Birmingham Bulldogs, Coventry Bears, Derby City, Gloucestershire Warriors, Leicester Phoenix, Nottingham Outlaws
- South Premier Division: Elmbridge, Ipswich Rhinos, Kent Ravens, London Skolars 'A', Portsmouth Navy Seahawks, South London Storm, St Albans Centurions, West London Sharks
- Welsh Premier Division: Blackwood Bulldogs, Bridgend Blue Bulls, Cardiff Demons, Neath Port Talbot Steelers, Newport Titans, Torfaen Tigers, Valley Cougars, West Wales Sharks
- Yorkshire Division: Bridlington Bulls, East Riding, Leeds Akkies 'A', Northallerton Stallions, Scarborough Pirates, York Lokomotive
- South Yorkshire & Lincolnshire Division: Lincoln City Knights, Moorends & Thorne Marauders, Rossington Sharks, Rotherham Giants, Scunthorpe Barbarians, Sheffield Forgers
- North West Division: Barrow Vikings, Blackpool Sea Eagles, Manchester Jets, New Broughton Rangers, Widnes Saints
- Cheshire Division: Lymm Wolves, Macclesfield Titans, Northwich Stags, Rhyl Coasters, Runcorn
- West Midlands Division: Bristol Sonics, Coventry Bears 'A', Oxford Cavaliers, Redditch Ravens, Swindon St George, Telford Raiders, Wolverhampton Wizards
- South West Division: Devon Sharks, East Devon Eagles, Exeter Centurions, Plymouth Titans, Somerset Vikings
- Eastern Division: Cambridge Eagles, Colchester Romans, Greenwich Admirals, Hainault Bulldogs, Northampton Casuals, St Ives Roosters, Thetford Titans
- Scottish Division: Carluke Tigers, Easterhouse Panthers, Edinburgh Eagles, Fife Lions, Glasgow Bulls, Jordanhill Phoenix, Moray Eels, Paisley Hurricanes

Glasgow Bulls, Manchester Jets and Macclesfield Titans all failed to start the season, with Kent Ravens having their fixtures stopped after one game, joined the London League. Established club Durham Tigers failed to complete the season in the North East division. Also while they withdrew before the fixtures were finalised Copeland Athletic were expected to play in the North West division.

=== 2009 ===
The North Premier Division was scrapped replaced by two new Premiers; the North West Premier and the Yorkshire Premier though the bulk of its membership joined the newly reformed North East Division. The heartland winter league the National Conference League launched a series of Summer Divisions in 2009 similar to the Conference.

The National Division lost Celtic Crusaders Colts to the Super League Reserve Grade but regained Carlisle Centurions from the North Premier Division and gained Nottingham Outlaws from the Midlands Premier Division

West Wales Sharks relocated and became Dinefwr Sharks. Thetford Titans moved to Bury St Edmunds and became Bury Titans. The North East saw established club Durham Tigers fail to return, but saw the return of rugby league to Winlaton in the name of Winlanton Warriors (Winlaton had previously not only had its own team in 2005 but had also hosted Gateshead Storm and Whitley Bay Barbarians). Victoria Knights were formed from the ashes of Paisley Hurricanes though could barely raise a team.

Nottingham Outlaws A, Moorends-Thorne Marauders A and Wigan Riversiders joined the Rugby League Conference from the RL Merit League. The Midlands Rugby League was formed out of the RL Merit League giving the Conference a new feeder competition with the RL Merit League being split into North West and Yorkshire divisions. Norwich City Saxons, Hainault Bulldogs 'A', Kent Ravens, Farnborough Falcons and Southampton Spitfires all moved up from the London ARL, this influx of new teams allowing the re-separation of the two Regional divisions in the South East (East and London & South).

Initial line-ups as follows (new clubs in italics):

- National Division: Bramley Buffaloes, Carlisle Centurions, Dewsbury Celtic, East Lancashire Lions, Featherstone Lions, Gateshead Storm, Hemel Stags, Huddersfield Underbank Rangers, Liverpool Buccaneers, Nottingham Outlaws, Warrington Wizards
- North West Premier Division: Blackpool Sea Eagles, Lymm RL, New Broughton Rangers, Rhyl Coasters, Runcorn RLC, Widnes Saints, Wigan Riversiders
- Yorkshire Premier Division: Bridlington Bulls, Cottingham Phoenix, East Riding Rangers, Kippax Knights, Leeds Akkies, Moorends-Thorne Marauders, Scarborough Pirates, York Lokomotive
- Midlands Premier Division: Birmingham Bulldogs, Bristol Sonics, Coventry Bears, Derby City, Gloucestershire Warriors, Leicester Phoenix, Redditch Ravens, Telford Raiders
- Southern Premier Division: Bedford Tigers, Elmbridge Eagles, Hainault Bulldogs, Ipswich Rhinos, London Skolars 'A', Portsmouth Navy Seahawks, South London Storm, St Albans Centurions, West London Sharks,
- Welsh Premier Division: Blackwood Bulldogs, Bridgend Blue Bulls, Cardiff Demons, Dinefwr Sharks, Torfaen Tigers, Neath Port Talbot Steelers, Newport Titans, Valley Cougars, West Wales Wildboars
- Scottish Division: Carluke Tigers, Easterhouse Panthers, Edinburgh Eagles, Fife Lions, Hillfoot Rams, Jordanhill Phoenix, Moray Eels, Paisley Hurricanes, Victoria Knights
- North East Division: Hartlepool, Jarrow Vikings, Newcastle Knights, Northallerton Stallions, Peterlee Pumas, Sunderland City, Whitley Bay Barbarians, Winlaton Warriors
- North Midlands: Leeds Akkies A, Lincoln City Knights, Moorends-Thorne Marauders 'A', Nottingham Outlaws 'A', Rotherham Giants, Scunthorpe Barbarians
- East Division: Bury Titans, Cambridge Eagles, Colchester Romans, Hainault Bulldogs A, St Ives Roosters, Northampton Casuals, Norwich City Saxons
- London & South Division: Farnborough Falcons, Greenwich Admirals, Kent Ravens, Oxford Cavaliers, Southampton Spitfires, Swindon St George
- South West Division: Devon Sharks, East Devon Eagles, Exeter Centurions, Plymouth Titans, Somerset Vikings, South Dorset Giants

Bridlington Bulls failed to start the season in the Yorkshire Premier division. Guildford Giants replaced Farnborough Falcons in the London & South division. Kent Ravens failed to complete the season in the London & South division. Moorends & Thorne Marauders 'A' failed to start the season in the North Midlands Division and were replaced by Parkside Hawks. Redditch Ravens failed to complete the season in the Midlands Premier Division and entered the Midlands Merit League. Telford Raiders also failed to complete the season in the Midlands Premier Division. However, their results stood. Cambridge Eagles and Hainault Bulldogs 'A' failed to complete the season in the Eastern Division. Plymouth Titans failed to complete the season in the South West division, but the results stood. Hartlepool failed to complete the season in the North East but the results stood.

=== 2010 ===
2010 saw an expansion in the numbers of divisions with the Midlands, Wales and North West all forming new regional divisions. The North Midlands division formed the basis for the new Yorkshire regional division.

These new divisions saw many teams step up from the merit leagues: Coventry Bears A, Birmingham Bulldogs A, North East Worcestershire Ravens (formerly Redditch Ravens) and Leamington Royals either joined or rejoined from the Midlands Rugby League; Chester Gladiators, Crewe & Nantwich Steamers, Wigan Riversiders Eels, Mancunians RL, Victoria Rangers and Barnsley Broncos (formerly called Barnsley) stepped up from the RL Merit League and Hammersmith Hills Hoists, St Albans Centurions A, South London Storm A and Sussex Merlins moved up from the London League. The National Conference League failed to repeat its summer experiment leading three clubs: East Leeds, Milford Marlins and Shaw Cross Sharks to join the Rugby League Conference.

2010 also saw an expansion of the Merit Leagues as the rump RL Merit League split into the Yorkshire & Humber Merit League and the North West Merit League. A plan to form a North Wales League failed, but a five team 9s tournament was played.

Gateshead Storm and Newcastle Knights merged to form Newcastle Storm, Ipswich Rhinos and Colchester Romans merged to form Eastern Rhinos. Leicester Phoenix became Leicester Storm. Northampton Casuals became Northampton Demons.

This season had a much higher rate of teams dropping out or forfeiting games than usual with for example the North West Premier division losing three out of five initial teams and the Welsh Regional Division having four out of the original seven teams fail to play a game.

The inaugural Rugby League Conference Regional Championships took place at Derby's Haslams Lane ground, with six representative teams representing different English regions. The event was won by the Midlands.

Initial line-ups as follows (new clubs in italics):

- National Division: Bramley Buffaloes, Carlisle Centurions, Dewsbury Celtic, Featherstone Lions, Hemel Stags, Huddersfield Underbank Rangers, Kippax Knights, Liverpool Buccaneers, Nottingham Outlaws, Warrington Wizards
- North West Premier Division: Lymm RL, New Broughton Rangers, Runcorn RLC, Widnes Saints, Wigan Riversiders
- Yorkshire Premier Division: East Leeds, Haworth Park, Milford Marlins, Moorends-Thorne Marauders, Rotherham Giants, Scarborough Pirates, York Lokomotive
- Midlands Premier Division: Birmingham Bulldogs, Bristol Sonics, Coventry Bears, Derby City, Gloucestershire Warriors, Leicester Storm
- Southern Premier Division: Eastern Rhinos, Hainault Bulldogs, Hammersmith Hillshoists, London Skolars 'A', Portsmouth Navy Seahawks, South London Storm, St Albans Centurions, West London Sharks,
- Welsh Premier Division: Blackwood Bulldogs, Bridgend Blue Bulls, Cardiff Demons, Carmarthenshire, Pembrokeshire & Ceredigion Bears, Newport Titans, Valley Cougars
- Scottish Division: Ayrshire Storm, Carluke Tigers, Easterhouse Panthers, Edinburgh Eagles, Falkirk, Fife Lions, Jordanhill Phoenix, Kirkcaldy, Moray Eels
- North East Division: Cramlington Rockets, Durham Demons, Jarrow Vikings, Newcastle Storm, Northallerton Stallions, Peterlee Pumas, Sunderland City, Wallsend Eagles, Whitley Bay Barbarians, Winlaton Warriors
- North West Regional Division: Blackpool Sea Eagles, Chester Gladiators, Crewe & Nantwich Steamers, Mancunians, Wigan Riversiders Eels
- Yorkshire Regional Division: Barnsley Broncos, Bradford Salem, Bradford Victoria Rangers, Leeds Akkies, Lincoln City Knights, Parkside Hawks, Scunthorpe Barbarians, Wetherby Bulldogs
- Midlands Regional Division: Birmingham Bulldogs A, Coventry Bears A, Leamington Royals, North East Worcestershire Ravens, Nottingham Outlaws A, Telford Raiders
- East Division: Bedford Tigers, Bury Titans, Northampton Demons, Norwich City Saxons, St Albans Centurions A, St Ives Roosters,
- London & South Division: Elmbridge Eagles, Guildford Giants, Greenwich Admirals, Oxford Cavaliers, South London Storm A, Southampton Spitfires, Sussex Merlins, Swindon St George
- South West Division: Devon Sharks, East Devon Eagles, Exeter Centurions, North Devon Raiders, Plymouth Titans, Somerset Vikings, South Dorset Giants, South Somerset Warriors
- South Wales Championship: Amman Valley Rhinos, Dinefwr Sharks, Tydfil Wildcats Rugby League, Neath Port Talbot Steelers, Swansea-Llanelli Dragons, Torfaen Tigers, Wildboars

Carlisle Centurions withdrew from the National Division mid-season and their results were expunged, Liverpool Buccaneers withdrew from the National Division and their results stood.

Jordanhill Phoenix and Kirkcaldy failed to start the season in the Scottish division, Forth & Clyde Nomads were brought in as replacements.

Runcorn and Widnes Saints withdrew from the North West Premier Division pre-season to be replaced by Widnes West Bank and Wirral Warriors. New Broughton Rangers folded midseason in the North West Premier Division.

Haworth Park failed to complete the season in the Yorkshire Premier Division but their results stood. Bradford Salem withdrew from the Yorkshire Regional Division to be replaced by Shaw Cross Sharks. Wetherby Bulldogs and Scunthorpe Barbarians failed to complete the season in the Yorkshire Regional division but their results stood.

Derby City withdrew mid-season from the Midlands Premier but their results stood. North East Worcestershire Ravens failed to complete the season in the Midlands Regional division but the results stood.

Blackwood Bulldogs failed to complete the season in the Welsh Premier division. Amman Valley Rhinos, Dinefwr Sharks, Wildboars (St Clears) and Swansea-Llanelli Dragons were all excluded from the Welsh Regional division after not fulfilling any fixtures and replaced by Dyffryn Devils.

St Albans Centurions A withdrew from the East Regional division but their fixtures stood.

=== 2011 ===
2011 saw the National Division regain Coventry Bears from the Midlands Premier Division and Valley Cougars step up from the Welsh Premier Division. Gateshead Lightning were admitted as well as a reserve team for Gateshead Thunder but failed to start the season.

2011 also saw more new divisions with Scotland and North East gaining a Premier Division and a new Regional Division being formed in the West of England with clubs from various divisions to reduce the travel burden. The Midlands Premier and Regional Divisions merged with a split season format. Yorkshire replaced its Premier and Regional Divisions with two geographically split divisions (west and east) that would have premier and regional division playoffs.

The only clubs moving up from feeder leagues were Northampton Demons A and Bristol Sonics A from the Midlands Rugby League and East Lancashire Vikings from the North West Merit League. A new feeder league was created the Eastern Merit League which split off from the London League. The Yorkshire & Humber Merit League split into a North division and a Midlands division.

The plans for 2012 saw several winter sides switching to summer with Cadishead Rhinos, Chorley Panthers and Rochdale Cobras joining the North West Regional division; Walton Warriors, Knottingley Rockware Stolze and Cutsyke Raiders in the Yorkshire East division and Doncaster Toll Bar, Guiseley Rangers and Lindley Swifts in the Yorkshire West (which also gained new side Prospect Pirates). There were also numerous BARLA clubs entering teams in the North West Merit League.

Northallerton Stallions moved to Catterick and became North Yorkshire Stallions. Newcastle Storm became Gateshead Storm. Newport Titans became Titans with a relocation to Machen.

Initial line-ups as follows (new clubs in italics):

- National Division: Bramley Buffaloes, Coventry Bears, Dewsbury Celtic, Featherstone Lions, Gateshead Lightning, Hemel Stags, Huddersfield Underbank Rangers, Kippax Knights, Nottingham Outlaws, Valley Cougars, Warrington Wizards
- North West Premier Division: Accrington & Leyland Lions, East Lancashire Vikings, Liverpool Buccaneers, Mancunians, Widnes West Bank, Wigan Riversiders
- Yorkshire Premier Division (East): Barnsley Broncos, Cutsyke Raiders, Knottingley Rockware Stolze, Moorends-Thorne Marauders, Rotherham Giants, Scarborough Pirates, Walton Warriors, York Lokomotive
- Yorkshire Premier Division (West): Doncaster Toll Bar, East Leeds, Guiseley Rangers, Leeds Akkies, Lindley Swifts Parkside Hawks, Prospect Pirates, Shaw Cross Sharks
- Midlands Division (West): Birmingham Bulldogs, Bristol Sonics, Leamington Royals, Telford Raiders
- Midlands Division (East): Birmingham Bulldogs A, Leicester Storm, Northampton Demons A, Nottingham Outlaws A
- Southern Premier Division: Eastern Rhinos, Hainault Bulldogs, Hammersmith Hillshoists, South London Storm, St Albans Centurions, West London Sharks,
- Welsh Premier Division: Bridgend Blue Bulls, Cardiff Demons, Carmarthenshire, Pembrokeshire & Ceredigion Bears, Titans, Torfaen Tigers, Valley Cougars A
- Scottish Premier Division: Ayrshire Storm, Carluke Tigers, Easterhouse Panthers, Edinburgh Eagles, Fife Lions, Moray Eels
- North East Premier Division: Gateshead Spartans, Gateshead Storm, Jarrow Vikings, Peterlee Pumas, Sunderland City, Wallsend Eagles
- Scottish 1st Division: Aberdeen Warriors, Ayr Knights, Cumbernauld, Falkirk, Moray Titans
- North East Regional Division: Cramlington Rockets, Durham Demons, East Cumbria Crusaders, Hartlepool, North Yorkshire Stallions, Peterlee Pumas A, Whitley Bay Barbarians, Winlaton Warriors
- North West Regional Division: Blackpool Sea Eagles, Cadishead Rhinos, Chester Gladiators, Chorley Panthers, Crewe & Nantwich Steamers, Rochdale Cobras
- East Division: Bedford Tigers, Bury Titans, Northampton Demons 'A', Norwich City Saxons, St Ives Roosters, Sudbury Gladiators
- London & South Division: Elmbridge Eagles, Guildford Giants, Greenwich Admirals, Medway Dragons, Portsmouth Navy Seahawks, Southampton Spitfires, Sussex Merlins
- South West Division: Devon Sharks, East Devon Eagles, Exeter Centurions, North Devon Raiders, Plymouth Titans, Somerset Vikings, South Dorset Giants, South Somerset Warriors
- West Of England Division: Bristol Sonics A, Gloucestershire Warriors, Oxford Cavaliers, Swindon St George, Wiltshire Wyverns
- South Wales Championship: Blackwood Bulldogs, Bonymaen Broncos, Dyffryn Devils, Tydfil Wildcats Rugby League, Neath Port Talbot Steelers

Gateshead Lightning failed to start the season in the National Division. Guiseley Rangers and East Leeds failed to start the season in the Yorkshire Premier (West). Doncaster Toll Bar failed to complete the season in the Yorkshire Premier Division (West) and their results stood. Moray Eels failed to start the season in the Scottish Premier division Falkirk failed to start the season in the Scottish 1st Division. Ayr Knights failed to complete the season in the Scottish 1st Division and their results stood. South Somerset Warriors failed to complete the season in the South West Division. CPC Bears failed to complete the season in the Welsh Premier and their results stood. Blackwood Bulldogs failed to start the season in the South Wales Championship. Hainault Bulldogs failed to complete the season in the Premier South division and had London Skolars A take over their fixtures midseason. Birmingham Bulldogs A failed to complete the season in the Midlands Division (East). Mancunians, Widnes West Bank and East Lancashire Vikings failed to complete the season in the North West Premier division and their results stood. Crewe & Nantwich Steamers failed to complete the season in the North West Regional division and their results stood. Norwich City Knights and Northampton Demons A failed to complete the season in the East division and their results stood

=== 2012 and the future ===
The RFL have released plans for a new structure in the summer game. Initial plans were for the Rugby League Conference to be scrapped and replaced with a Northern and Southern Conference at tier 4 to replace the National division (and the National Conference League that switched from winter). These plans were later amended to have three National Conference League divisions staying as they were underpinned by a separate division 4 based on the Rugby League Conference National division.

Tier 5 will consist of a series of regional leagues where Rugby League Conference clubs will be joined by some BARLA clubs switching to summer. These regional leagues will include the Yorkshire Men's League, North West Men's League and Midlands Rugby League and cover the length and breadth of the country.

== See also ==
- Rugby League Conference
- Rugby League Conference trophy winners
- History of the Midlands Merit League
