= Rugby League Conference trophy winners =

The Rugby League Conference (RLC), also known as the Co-operative Rugby League Conference as a result of sponsorship from the Co-operative Group, is a series of regionally based divisions of amateur rugby league teams spread throughout England, Scotland, and Wales.

It was founded in 1997 as the Southern Conference League with two Divisions: East and Central. Over time, it expanded and added more and more divisions. It was replaced in 2012 with a series of regional leagues.

== The trophies ==
The Harry Jepson Trophy was competed for by all the Conference sides until 2005 and the advent of Premier Divisions. Until 2004 it was possible for a team to finish runners-up in their division, qualify for the play-offs and still win the Harry Jepson trophy, hence some champions did not pick up a regional title in the same year. From 2005, the Harry Jepson trophy was solely for the winners of the RLC Premier divisions. Conference sides that remained in the regional divisions competed for a new trophy - the RLC Regional. The Harry Jepson trophy is still contested by teams from RLC successor leagues.

The RLC Challenge was a knock-out competition designed to give clubs meaningful pre-season games.

The RLC Shield was an optional secondary competition for RLC Regional sides not making their divisions' play-offs. It was first contested in 2002 and continued until 2005.

National League Three was absorbed into the Rugby League Conference as the Rugby League Conference National Division in 2007.

The Welsh Shield was a secondary Welsh competition for teams which did not make the play-offs for the Welsh Division. It was played for in 2004 and 2005. The Welsh premier division was split into two divisions: East and West in 2006, though this was reversed for the following season. A play-off determined the overall Welsh champion.

== 1997 ==
- Harry Jepson Trophy: North London Skolars (now London Skolars)
- Central Division: Leicester Phoenix
- Eastern Division: North London Skolars (now London Skolars)

== 1998 ==
- Harry Jepson Trophy: Crawley Jets
- Western Division: Chester Wolves (now Lymm RL)
- Eastern Division: South Norfolk Saints (now Bury Titans)
- Southern Division: Crawley Jets

== 1999 ==
- Harry Jepson Trophy: Chester Wolves (now Lymm RL)
- Northern Division: Chester Wolves (now Lymm RL)
- Western Division: Cheltenham Warriors (now Gloucestershire Warriors)
- Eastern Division: Ipswich Rhinos (now Eastern Rhinos)
- Southern Division: Crawley Jets

== 2000 ==
- Harry Jepson Trophy: Crawley Jets
- Northern Division: Manchester Knights
- Western Division: Birmingham Bulldogs
- Eastern Division: Hemel Stags
- Southern Division: North London Skolars (now London Skolars)

== 2001 ==
- Harry Jepson Trophy: Teesside Steelers
- North East Division: Teesside Steelers
- Northern Division: Rotherham Giants
- Midlands Division: Coventry Bears
- South Central Division: Hemel Stags
- Eastern Division: Ipswich Rhinos (now Eastern Rhinos)
- London & South Division: Crawley Jets

== 2002 ==
- Harry Jepson Trophy: Coventry Bears
- RLC Shield: South London Storm
- North East Division: Teesside Steelers
- Northern Division: Manchester Knights
- Midlands Division: Coventry Bears
- South Central Division: Hemel Stags
- Eastern Division: Luton Vipers
- London & South Division: North London Skolars (now London Skolars)

== 2003 ==
- Harry Jepson Trophy: Bridgend Blue Bulls
- RLC Shield: Bolton Le Moors (now East Lancashire Lions)
- North East Division: Leeds Akademiks (now Leeds Akkies)
- North West Division: Carlisle Centurions (now East Cumbria Crusaders)
- North Midlands Division: Nottingham Outlaws
- Midlands Division: Birmingham Bulldogs
- South West Division: Cardiff Demons
- Welsh Division: Bridgend Blue Bulls
- Eastern Division: South Norfolk Saints (now Bury Titans)
- London & South Division: Crawley Jets

== 2004 ==
- Harry Jepson Trophy: Widnes Saints
- RLC Shield: Cardiff Demons
- RLC Challenge Cup: North London Skolars 'A' (now London Skolars)
- North East Division: Newcastle Knights (now Newcastle Storm)
- Yorkshire Division: Leeds Akademiks (now Leeds Akkies)
- Cumbrian Division: Penrith Pumas
- North West Division: Widnes Saints
- North Midlands Division: Nottingham Outlaws
- South Midlands Division: Leicester Phoenix
- Western Division: Somerset Vikings
- Welsh Division: Bridgend Blue Bulls
- Welsh Shield: Cardiff Demons
- Eastern Division: Ipswich Rhinos (now Eastern Rhinos)
- South Division: West London Sharks

== 2005 ==
- Harry Jepson Trophy: Bridgend Blue Bulls
- RLC Regional: Wetherby Bulldogs
- RLC Shield: Blackpool Sea Eagles
- North Premier: West Cumbria Crusaders
- Central Premier: Leeds Akkies
- South Premier: South London Storm
- Welsh Premier: Bridgend Blue Bulls
- Welsh Shield: Newport Titans (now Titans RLFC)
- North East Division: Durham Tigers
- Yorkshire Division: Wetherby Bulldogs
- North West Division: Rochdale Spotland Rangers
- North Midlands Division: Thorne Moor Marauders (now Moorends & Thorne Marauders)
- West Midlands Division: Wolverhampton Wizards (now Wolverhampton RLFC)
- South West Division: Gloucestershire Warriors
- Eastern Division: St Albans Centurions 'A'
- London & South Division: Kingston Warriors (now Elmbridge)

== 2006 ==
- Harry Jepson Trophy: South London Storm
- RLC Regional: Liverpool Buccaneers
- North Premier: East Lancashire Lions
- Midlands Premier: Nottingham Outlaws
- South Premier: South London Storm
- Welsh Premier: Bridgend Blue Bulls
- Welsh Premier (East): Cardiff Demons
- Welsh Premier (West): Bridgend Blue Bulls
- North Division: Carlisle Centurions (now East Cumbria Crusaders)
- Yorkshire Division: Bridlington Bulls
- Cheshire Division: Liverpool Buccaneers
- North Midlands & South Yorkshire Division: Moorends-Thorne Marauders
- West Midlands and South West Division: Gloucestershire Warriors
- Eastern Division: Bedford Tigers
- South East Division: Broadstairs Bulldogs

== 2007 ==
- Rugby League Conference National: Featherstone Lions
- Harry Jepson Trophy: St Albans Centurions
- RLC Regional: Widnes Saints
- North Premier: Carlisle Centurions (now East Cumbria Crusaders)
- Midlands Premier: Coventry Bears
- South Premier: St Albans Centurions
- Welsh Premier: Bridgend Blue Bulls
- Yorkshire & Lincolnshire Division: Rossington Sharks
- North West Division: Widnes Saints
- Cheshire Division: Macclesfield Titans
- West Midlands Division: Bristol Sonics
- South West Division: Plymouth Titans
- Eastern Division: Bedford Tigers
- South Division: Farnborough Falcons
- Scottish Division: Edinburgh Eagles

== 2008 ==
- Rugby League Conference National: Crusaders Colts
- Harry Jepson Trophy: Nottingham Outlaws
- RLC Regional: Moorends-Thorne Marauders
- North Premier: Carlisle Centurions (now East Cumbria Crusaders)
- Midlands Premier: Nottingham Outlaws
- South Premier: West London Sharks
- Welsh Premier: Valley Cougars
- Yorkshire Division: Bridlington Bulls
- South Yorkshire & Lincolnshire Division: Moorends-Thorne Marauders
- North West Division: Widnes Saints
- Cheshire Division: Northwich Stags
- West Midlands Division: Bristol Sonics
- South West Division: East Devon Eagles
- Eastern Division: Hainault Bulldogs
- Scottish Division: Edinburgh Eagles
- Scottish Shield: Carluke Tigers
- Women's Rugby League Conference: West London Sharks Ladies

== 2009 ==
- Rugby League Conference National: Bramley Buffaloes
- Harry Jepson Trophy: West London Sharks
- RLC Regional: Northampton Casuals (now Northampton Demons)
- North West Premier: Lymm RL
- Yorkshire Premier: Kippax Knights
- Midlands Premier: Coventry Bears
- Southern Premier: West London Sharks
- Welsh Premier: Blackwood Bulldogs
- Welsh Plate: Newport Titans (now Titans RLFC)
- Scottish Division: Edinburgh Eagles
- North East Division: Jarrow Vikings
- North Midlands Division: Parkside Hawks
- East Division: Northampton Casuals (now Northampton Demons)
- London & South Division: Greenwich Admirals
- South West Division: Devon Sharks
- Women's National Division: Bradford Thunderbirds
- Women's RLC Regional: Hillside Hawks
- Women's North West Division: Hillside Hawks
- Women's Yorkshire Division: Keighley Cats

== 2010 ==
- Rugby League Conference National: Warrington Wizards
- Harry Jepson Trophy: St Albans Centurions
- RLC Regional: Northampton Demons
- North West Premier: Widnes West Bank Bears
- Yorkshire Premier: East Leeds
- Midlands Premier: Coventry Bears
- Southern Premier: St Albans Centurions
- Welsh Premier: Valley Cougars
- Welsh Division: Neath Port Talbot Steelers
- Scottish Division: Carluke Tigers
- North East Division: Jarrow Vikings
- North East Plate: Northallerton Stallions (now North Yorkshire Stallions)
- Yorkshire Division: Parkside Hawks
- North West Division: Mancunians RL
- Midlands Division: Leamington Royals
- East Division: Northampton Demons
- London & South Division: Greenwich Admirals
- South West Division: East Devon Eagles
- Rugby League Conference Regional Championships: Midlands
- Women's RLC: Keighley Cats
- Women's RLC Plate: Coventry Bears

== 2011 ==
- Rugby League Conference National: Huddersfield Underbank Rangers
- Harry Jepson Trophy: Parkside Hawks
- RLC Regional: Elmbridge Eagles
- North West Premier: Accrington and Leyland Lions
- North East Premier: Peterlee Pumas
- Yorkshire Premier: Parkside Hawks
- Midlands Premier: Bristol Sonics
- Southern Premier: Hammersmith Hills Hoists
- Scottish Premier: Edinburgh Eagles
- Welsh Premier: Bridgend Blue Bulls
- Welsh Championship: Bonymaen Broncos
- Scottish Division: Aberdeen Warriors
- North East Division: North Yorkshire Stallions
- North West Division: Rochdale Cobras
- Midlands Division: Telford Raiders
- East Division: Sudbury Gladiators
- London & South Division: Elmbridge Eagles
- South West Division: Somerset Vikings
- West of England: Gloucestershire Warriors
- Women's RLC: Warrington
- Women's RLC Plate: Leeds Akkies
- Women's RLC South Division: Coventry Bears
- Women's RLC North East Division: Hunslet Hawks
- Women's RLC Central Division: Bradford Thunderbirds
- Women's RLC North West Division: Leigh East
- Women's RLC West Division: Halton

== See also ==
- History of the Rugby League Conference
