= South London Storm =

English amateur rugby league club, based in Croydon, South London

Club information
- Full name: South London Storm Rugby League Club
- Colours: Maroon and White
- Founded: 21 July 1997; 29 years ago
- Exited: 2013; 13 years ago
- Website: www.stormrl.com

Former details
- Ground: Archbishop Lanfranc School, Merton
- Competition: Rugby League Conference South Premier

South London Storm was a rugby league club who played and trained at Archbishop Lanfranc School in the London Borough of Croydon. They competed in the London and South East Merit League.

Founded in 1997, Storm were voted Rugby League Conference "Club of the Year" three times, in 2002, 2005 and 2006.

In 2013, South London Storm merged with West London Sharks to form South West London Chargers.

== Club honours ==
- Harry Jepson Trophy (RLC National Champions): Winners 2006
- RLC Club Of The Year: 2002, 2005, 2006
- RLC Shield: Winners 2002
- Active Sports Club Of The Year Award: 2004
- BBC London Amateur Sports Club of the Year: 2006
- RLC Premier South Division Winners: 2005, 2006, 2009
- RLC Premier South Division Runners Up: 2007, 2008
- RLC Premier South Grand Final Winners: 2005, 2006
- RLC Premier South Grand Final Runners Up: 2007, 2008, 2009
- London Academy Final: Winners 2009
- London Amateur Rugby League (2nd XIII): Winners 2006
- Gordon Anderton Memorial Trophy: Runners Up 1997–98, 1998–99
- London League Cup: Runners Up 2000
- Rugby League Challenge Cup: 2nd Round 2005

== Player Records ==
- Most Tries in a match: 6 Mark Nesbitt vs Aberavon Fighting Irish - 2003
- Most Goals in a match: 17 Tom Bold vs Bedford Tigers - 2009
- Most Points in a match: 38 Darren Bartley vs Kent Ravens - 2007
- Most Tries in a season: 28 Louis Neethling - 2005
- Most Goals in a season: 102 Louis Neethling - 2005
- Most Points in a season: 316 Louis Neethling - 2005
- Most First Grade Appearances: 102 Carl Zacharow - (2002–present)

== Club Records ==
- Most Points Scored: 102 vs Bedford Tigers - 2009
- Most Points Conceded: 100 vs Crawley Jets - 2000 & West London Sharks - 2002
- Biggest Home Win: (90 points) 94–4 vs London Skolars - 2005 & 102–12 vs Bedford Tigers - 2009
- Biggest Away Win: (72 points) 76–4 vs Sunderland Nissan - 2005 & Greenwich Admirals - 2005
- Biggest Home Defeat: (90 points) 0–90 vs London Skolars - 2001
- Biggest Away Defeat: (98 points) 2–100 vs Crawley Jets - 2000
- Highest Scoring Game: 114 points vs Bedford Tigers (102–12) - 2009
- Lowest Scoring Game: 22 vs Ipswich Rhinos (18–4) - 2007
- Longest Undefeated Run: 14 games - 24 June 2006 to 30 June 2007
- Longest Run Without a Win: 9 games - 6 May 2000 to 1 July 2000

== Coaches ==
- (England) Julian Critchley - 1997–98
- (England) Ian Curzon - 1998–99
- (England) Julian Critchley & Graeme Harker - 2000
- (England) Paul Johnstone - 2001
- (England) Andy Fleming - 2001
- (England) Julian Critchley & Graeme Harker - 2001
- (New Zealand) Anthony Lipscombe - 2002
- (Australia) Darryl Pitt - 2003 & 2004
- (England) Rob Powell - 2005 & 2006
- (England) Andy Gilvary & (Australia) Dave Wilson - 2007
- (England) Marcus Tobin - 2008
- (England) James Massara - 2009
- (Australia) Paul Brown - 2011
- (England) Ben Cramant & (Australia) Mick Gray - 2012

== Former Players Now At Pro Clubs ==
- (England) Will Sharp - Harlequins RL
- (Jamaica) Lamont Bryan - Harlequins RL
- (Cricket West Indies) Corey Simms - London Skolars
- (England) Adam Janowski - Harlequins RL
- (England) Rob Powell - Harlequins RL (assistant coach)
- (England) Alex Ingarfield - Harlequins RL
- Jack Kendall - England under 18 England deaf London Irish RFU - Dewsbury Rams RL.

== First Grade Playing Record - 2000 to 2011 ==
Up to and including 2 July 2011.

Competition	Years	Pld	W	D	L	F	A
Rugby League Conference	2000–2002	34	6	0	28	521	1757
Rugby League Conference Play Offs	2002	6	6	0	0	179	66
Rugby League Conference Cup	2003	8	4	1	3	229	143
National League 3	2003–2004	33	14	1	18	764	862
Rugby League Conference Premier	2005–2011	80	54	1	25	3234	1854
Rugby League Conference Premier Play Offs	2005–2009	12	8	0	4	400	188
Challenge Cup	2004, 2005, 2007	4	1	0	3	70	164
Total	2000 - 2011	177	93	3	81	5387	4934

Opponents	Pld	W	D	L	F	A
Aberavon Fighting Irish	1	1	0	0	44	10
Bedford Swifts	3	2	0	1	86	46
Bedford Tigers	1	1	0	0	102	12
Birmingham Bulldogs	2	2	0	0	56	46
Bradford Dudley Hill	2	1	0	1	18	57
Bramley Buffaloes	2	1	0	1	44	52
Bridgend Blue Bulls	2	1	0	1	50	46
Carlisle Centurions	1	1	0	0	36	16
Castleford Lock Lane	1	0	0	1	24	50
Coventry Bears	6	3	0	3	142	162
Crawley Jets	6	0	0	6	48	456
Crewe Wolves	3	2	0	1	66	66
East Lancashire Lions	1	1	0	0	30	0
Elmbridge Eagles (Kingston Warriors)	14	11	0	3	612	262
Essex Eels	3	3	0	0	176	38
Gateshead Storm	1	1	0	0	32	20
Greenwich Admirals	4	4	0	0	200	30
Hainault Bulldogs	4	3	0	1	184	94
Haringey Hornets	2	2	0	0	68	58
Hammersmith Hillhoists	3	0	0	3	56	118
Hemel Stags	4	2	0	2	66	116
Huddersfield Underbank Rangers	2	1	1	0	48	40
Ipswich Rhinos/Eastern Rhinos	16	10	0	6	526	307
Kent Ravens	2	2	0	0	140	2
Luton Vipers	1	1	0	0	68	4
Manchester Knights	2	2	0	0	70	14
London Skolars	21	10	1	10	665	670
Oxford Cavaliers	6	2	0	4	112	248
Portsmouth Navy Seahawks	5	4	0	1	278	118
St Albans Centurions	17	4	0	13	324	546
Sheffield Hillsborough Hawks	4	1	0	3	90	119
Sunderland Nissan	2	2	0	0	148	10
Teesside Steelers	1	0	0	1	32	36
Thornhill Trojans	1	0	0	1	18	58
Woolston Rovers (Warrington)	2	0	0	2	18	76
West Bowling	1	0	0	1	4	36
West London Sharks	28	12	1	15	712	903

== Second Grade Playing Record - 2003 to 2011 ==
Up to and including 2 July 2011.

Competition	Years	Pld	W	D	L	F	A
Rugby League Conference	2003–2005, 2010	26	1	0	25	342	1401
London League	2006–2009, 2011	35	16	1	18	1131	1167
London League Play Offs	2006–2009	5	2	0	3	154	142
Total	2003–2009	63	18	1	44	1509	2618

Opponents	Pld	W	D	L	F	A
Bedford Tigers	3	2	0	1	86	46
Crawley Jets	2	0	0	2	6	176
Elmbridge Eagles (Kingston Warriors)	7	0	0	7	72	429
Farnborough Falcons	1	0	0	1	28	40
Feltham YOI	1	1	0	0	64	52
Gosport Vikings	4	0	0	4	50	172
Greenwich Admirals	6	1	0	5	62	270
Guildford Giants	3	2	0	2	80	104
Hammersmith Hills Hoists	3	0	0	3	40	178
Haringey Hornets	2	0	0	2	30	98
Hemel Stags	5	2	0	3	146	128
Kent Ravens	4	3	0	1	188	112
Kentish Tigers	1	1	0	0	33	24
London Griffins	1	0	0	1	22	38
London Skolars	2	0	0	2	24	138
Luton Vipers	2	1	0	1	58	74
Met Police	1	0	0	1	26	34
Mudchute Uncles	1	0	0	1	0	28
Oxford Cavaliers	1	1	0	0	40	24
Phantoms RL	1	1	0	0	70	4
Smallford Saints	2	1	0	1	80	58
Southampton Spitfires	3	2	0	1	108	76
Southend Seaxes	1	1	0	0	40	14
Southgate Skolars	3	1	0	2	48	113
Swindon St George	1	1	0	0	98	0
St Albans Centurions	4	1	0	3	100	88
Sussex Merlins	4	2	0	2	156	146
West London Sharks	14	2	1	11	348	670

== Club history ==
The South London area has a strong rugby league tradition, and many of London’s most successful amateur clubs have come from this part of the capital. For nearly three decades clubs such as Streatham Celtic, Peckham Pumas and South London Warriors dominated the London League, and between them they won the title over twenty times. The mid-1990s heralded the demise of these once dominant clubs leaving the league without a club south of the Thames.

To fill this void the current South London club was formed on 21 July 1997 by Jed Donnelly, Graeme Harker and Julian Critchley in a bar after London Broncos' World Club Championship victory against Canberra Raiders on 21 July 1997. Initially nicknamed 'the Saints', as one of the founder members was a supporter of St Helens, the fledgling club recruited many of its players from the recently defunct east London, Bexleyheath and Peckham outfits, and they approached the local rugby union club, Streatham-Croydon, about basing themselves at their Frant Road ground. Storm's original colours were red and black.

=== London League ===
Saints were immediately accepted into the London League, and in their debut season they finished third in the Second Division behind Kingston and St Albans Centurions. That 1997/98 season culminated in an appearance in the Gordon Anderton Memorial Trophy Final against Reading Raiders at the New River Stadium. The 24–28 was a cruel blow for a team that were considered to have enjoyed the better of the game, but two controversial Raiders’ tries in the closing two minutes sealed Saints’ fate.

The 1998/99 season was one that promised much for Saints but, due to the near collapse of the league, that potential was largely unfulfilled, although South London did eventually emerge from the debris as runners-up to the London Colonials. A second successive appearance in the Gordon Anderton Memorial Trophy Final again ended in defeat (28–32), this time at the hands of a strong Metropolitan Police team.

It was in February 1999 that the club launched its junior section, initially at U11 only. The bulk of the youngsters came from the neighbouring Whitehorse Manor School where Saints scrum-half Lee Mason-Ellis was a teacher. They made their competitive debut two months later against Kingston Warriors, at the time the only other junior club in the capital, losing narrowly in an exciting encounter.

For the seniors, with the prospect of winter rugby league looking increasingly forlorn, South's thoughts turned to the new summer competition, the Rugby League Conference. The name of the club was changed to South London Storm as there were two other teams known as 'the Saints' in the Conference. Three months later the club was accepted into the Southern Division of the expanding competition. For the club's switch to summer in 2000 the colours were changed to maroon.

=== 2000 ===
It was a real baptism of fire for Storm in the RLC, as they managed only a single win – away at Kingston – to finish bottom of their group. The season opener at home to Oxford Cavaliers (4–62) was covered by the Independent newspaper. Despite suffering a number of maulings (including a 2–100 loss at the hands of Crawley Jets), enthusiasm never waned and the club did much to raise the profile of the sport in this corner of the capital. Amazingly, Storm's season ended with an appearance in the London League Final against St Albans Centurions. But once again Storm were left frustrated as the Hertfordshire side emerged victorious from a gripping encounter. A member of Storm's team that day, and Man of the Match, was Ryan Jones who went on the play for and captain the Welsh rugby union team, and who was a member of the tour to New Zealand.

The club made sporting history in October when the under-11s played their counterparts from Kingston Warriors in the curtain raiser to the England vs Australia Rugby League World Cup clash at Twickenham. It was the first ever game of rugby league at union's headquarters and Storm's Mark Cole, cousin of England footballer Joe Cole, scored the first ever try at the stadium and Rob Harker scored the first ever hat-trick of tries.

South London Storm was still operating, albeit as a Masters XIII, as recently as 2014, playing 1/2 fixtures a year

In 2017 they moved into Club Langley and played under the moniker of ‘Silverbacks’ for 3 seasons, during which a historic first ever Masters Tour to Canada was undertaken in June 2019

The first ever transatlantic Masters game between a UK Masters team against the Toronto Wolfpack Masters team at the Lamport stadium, followed by a further match against the Ontario Greybeards two days later

As is the nomadic existence of Rugby League in south London, we move onto the next chapter of the South London Storm - the South London Clippers Masters, playing out of Greenwich from 2020

==== Season's Record ====
First Grade

Rugby League Conference South

- 06/05/2000 South London Storm 4 Oxford Cavaliers 62
- 13/05/2000 West London Sharks 60 South London Storm 6
- 20/05/2000 Crawley Jets 100 South London Storm 2
- 27/05/2000 South London Storm 24 Kingston Warriors 26
- 03/06/2000 South London Storm 8 St Albans Centurions 58
- 10/06/2000 South London Storm 8 North London Skolars 78
- 17/06/2000 Oxford Cavaliers 72 South London Storm 0
- 24/06/2000 South London Storm 0 West London Sharks 68
- 01/07/2000 South London Storm 6 Crawley Jets 90
- 08/07/2000 Kingston Warriors 16 South London Storm 24
- 15/07/2000 St Albans Centurions 50 South London Storm 10
- 22/07/2000 North London Skolars 70 South London Storm 14

	Pld	W	D	L	F	A
Home	6	0	0	6	50	382
Away	6	1	0	5	56	368

=== 2001 ===
2001 was a much improved year for the club and, although they won only three of their matches, Storm were a much more competitive outfit and got better as the year progressed, as narrow losses to the West London Sharks and North London Skolars proved towards the end of the season. The trio of wins, against Bedford Swifts (22–6), Crewe Wolves (20–16) and Kingston Warriors (46–10) all came in the second half of the season, after an opening sequence of six successive losses including a 6–100 drubbing at the hands of West London.

The season was notable for scrum-half Terry Reader's individual achievement of successfully kicking 29 successive conversions.

==== Season's Record ====
First Grade

Rugby League Conference South

- 05/05/2001 Bedford Swifts 38 South London Storm 10
- 12/05/2001 South London Storm 0 North London Skolars 90
- 19/05/2001 Crewe Wolves 36 South London Storm 25
- 26/05/2001 Crawley Jets 66 South London Storm 12
- 02/06/2001 South London Storm 26 Kingston Warriors 38
- 09/06/2001 West London Sharks 100 South London Storm 6
- 16/06/2001 South London Storm 22 Bedford Swifts 6
- 30/06/2001 North London Skolars 42 South London Storm 12
- 07/07/2001 South London Storm 20 Crewe Wolves 16
- 14/07/2001 South London Storm 12 Crawley Jets 72
- 21/07/2001 Kingston Warriors 10 South London Storm 46
- 04/08/2001 South London Storm 16 West London Sharks 41

	Pld	W	D	L	F	A
Home	6	2	0	4	96	263
Away	6	1	0	5	111	292

=== 2002 ===
2002 was the season when South London finally started to fulfil their potential. New Zealander Anthony Lipscombe took up the coaching reins, and brought about a steady improvement to the team's performances on the park. Storm's pre-season preparation got off to a good start with a surprise success in the prestigious St Albans 9s Festival. Using a squad made up of mainly new players, they defeated their Centurion hosts quite comfortably in the Final. The regular season saw Storm suffer a succession of frustratingly narrow defeats – most by ten points or less – to finish bottom of the South Division, but it was in the end-of-season Shield Play Offs that saw the team hit form. Group wins over Kingston Warriors (28–22 and 36–4) and Oxford Cavaliers (21–12 in both games), took South London to Cheltenham’s Prince of Wales Stadium for a semi-final clash with Crewe Wolves. It was a tough encounter that for long periods looked to be going Wolves’ way, but Storm dug in to prevail 21–14, courtesy of two late tries from Carl Zacharow and Keri Ryan.

A fortnight later, also at the Prince of Wales Stadium, South London met Bedford Swifts in the Rugby League Conference Shield Final, where they treated the large crowd, and the Sky TV cameras, to an exhilarating display of running rugby. Storm ran in ten tries in a runaway 54–2 victory, Caro Wild led the way with a hat-trick, Daniel Poireaudeau grabbed two, and Terry Reader, Keri Ryan, Nathan Price-Saleh, Aaron Russell and Alun Watkins pitched in with one apiece.

The final whistle sparked terrific celebrations both on the pitch and in the stand where Storm's large traveling support cheered Keri Ryan as he lifted the club's first ever major trophy.

Once again Storm fielded a second team in the London League, and although wins were hard to come by, only one all season, the players showed great enthusiasm with a number graduating to the first team. The season ended with the club's first overseas tour. A party of 24 travelled to the south of France to play French National One club Realmont XIII. In front of a crowd of 750 – a quarter of the town's population – Storm put up a brave performance, but were eventually downed 18–36.

To round off the club's most successful season ever, Captain Keri Ryan was named at stand-off in the 2002 Rugby League Conference Dream Team, and full-back Corey Simms was named the competition's Young Player Of The Year.

Fittingly, the club was also presented with the award for Rugby League Conference Club of The Year 2002.

==== Season's Record ====
First Grade

Rugby League Conference South

- 04/05/2002 Kingston Warriors 36 South London Storm 22
- 11/05/2002 South London Storm 20 West London Sharks 32
- 18/05/2002 North London Skolars 66 South London Storm 16
- 25/05/2002 Oxford Cavaliers 40 South London Storm 30
- 01/06/2002 South London Storm 16 Crawley Jets 48
- 08/06/2002 South London Storm 42 Kingston Warriors 18
- 22/06/2002 West London Sharks 32 South London Storm 18
- 29/06/2002 South London Storm 6 North London Skolars 50
- 06/07/2002 South London Storm 38 Oxford Cavaliers 50
- 13/07/2002 Crawley Jets 80 South London Storm 0

	Pld	W	D	L	F	A
Home	5	1	0	4	122	198
Away	5	0	0	5	86	254

RLC Shield Play Offs

- 27/07/2002 Kingston Warriors 22 South London Storm 28 (Group)
- 03/08/2002 South London Storm 20 Oxford Cavaliers 12 (Group)
- 10/08/2002 South London Storm 36 Kingston Warriors 4 (Group)
- 17/08/2002 Oxford Cavaliers 12 South London Storm 20 (Group)
- 24/08/2002 Crewe Wolves 14 South London Storm 21 (Semi-Final)
- 31/08/2002 South London Storm 54 Bedford Swifts 2 (Final)

	Pld	W	D	L	F	A
Home	2	2	0	0	56	16
Away	2	2	0	0	48	34
Neutral	2	2	0	0	75	16

=== 2003 ===
Buoyed by their success in the RLC Shield, Storm were encouraged to apply for membership of the newly formed National League Three. The application was successful, however, following a number of internal meetings the club reluctantly decided against taking the step up and instead remain in the RLC. However, only four weeks before the start of the season local rivals Crawley Jets folded, and Storm accepted the RFL's last minute invitation to participate in NL3. The club also entered a second team in the RLC, and employed the first full-time Rugby League Development Officer in the area, accelerating the junior development program started by volunteers in 2000. Under the South London Storm “umbrella” are the three junior feeder clubs formed – the Croydon Hurricanes, Thornton Heath Tornadoes, and the Brixton Bulls.

Coached by ex-London Broncos player Darryl Pitt, the club opened their league campaign with an against-the-odds 24–16 victory over Huddersfield Underbank Rangers. It was a win that was all the more remarkable for the fact that they were down to 12 men after only 5 seconds; prop Mick Smith having been sent off in the first tackle. Storm registered a further five wins in the season but missed out on the end of season play-offs.

The club made a second tour to France in September, losing 22–48 against a Salses XIII line up containing three ex-French internationals.

In November Storm played a charity match against an Australian Legends of League side including the likes of Jason Hetherington, Trevor Gillmeister, Craig Coleman, Andrew Farrar and Peter Tunks. The score was 24–20 in favour of the Legends.

That same month Storm played their first ever Rugby League Challenge Cup game when they hosted National Conference side West Bowling in the preliminary round, losing 4–36.

In 2003 Storm were represented at International level for the first time when U15 player Adam Janowski was selected to play for England U15s against their Welsh counterparts at Easter.

==== Season's Record ====
Rugby League Conference Cup

- 03/03/2003 South London Storm 24 West London Sharks 24
- 09/03/2003 Greenwich Admirals 6 South London Storm 16
- 16/03/2003 North London Skolars 34 South London Storm 20
- 23/03/2003 South London Storm 14 North London Skolars 15
- 30/03/2003 West London Sharks 16 South London Storm 30
- 05/04/2003 South London Storm 62 Greenwich Admirals 20
- 13/04/2003 Aberavon Fighting Irish 10 South London Storm 44 (Quarter-Final)
- 18/04/2003 North London Skolars 28 South London Storm 19 (Semi-Final)

	Pld	W	D	L	F	A
Home	3	1	1	1	100	59
Away	5	3	0	2	129	94

First Grade

National League 3

- 03/05/2003 South London Storm 24 Huddersfield Underbank Rangers 16
- 10/05/2003 Dudley Hill 42 South London Storm 0
- 17/05/2003 Coventry Bears 20 South London Storm 14
- 31/05/2003 South London Storm 28 Sheffield Hillsborough Hawks 22
- 07/06/2003 Manchester Knights 2 South London Storm 42
- 14/06/2003 St Albans Centurions 38 South London Storm 18
- 21/06/2003 Sheffield Hillsborough Hawks 36 South London Storm 10
- 28/06/2003 South London Storm 26 Hemel Stags 8
- 05/07/2003 South London Storm 6 St Albans Centurions 28
- 12/06/2003 South London Storm 32 Teesside Steelers 36
- 19/07/2003 Hemel Stags 16 South London Storm 22
- 26/06/2003 South London Storm 4 Woolston Rovers (Warrington) 32
- 02/08/2003 South London Storm 34 Coventry Bears 22
- 09/08/2003 Woolston Rovers (Warrington) 44 South London Storm 14

	Pld	W	D	L	F	A
Home	7	4	0	3	154	166
Away	7	2	0	5	120	198

Second Grade

Rugby League Conference South

- 03/05/2003 Gosport Vikings 80 South London Storm 4
- 10/05/2003 South London Storm 16 Greenwich Admirals 40
- 17/05/2003 South London Storm 18 Hemel Stags 12
- 31/05/2003 South London Storm 0 Crawley Jets 88
- 07/06/2003 South London Storm 14 Gosport Vikings 24
- 14/06/2003 West London Sharks 88 South London Storm 12
- 28/06/2003 Greenwich Admirals 62 South London Storm 8
- 05/07/2003 South London Storm 16 Kingston Warriors 26
- 12/07/2003 North London Skolars 82 South London Storm 8
- 19/07/2003 Crawley Jets 88 South London Storm 6

	Pld	W	D	L	F	A
Home	5	1	0	4	64	190
Away	5	0	0	5	36	406

=== 2004 ===
Storm again participated in National League Three and after victories in their opening three games, against Manchester, Bradford Dudley Hill and Birmingham, they topped the division for the one and only time. However, after the promising start, the season tailed off and once again Storm narrowly missed out on the play-offs. During the year Storm were awarded the Active Sports Club of the Year award from 400 participating sports clubs signed up to the Active Sports program, the biggest sports development programme in London. The club also embarked on a historic tour to Australia – the first British Rugby League team to tour Australia since 1997 – with games against Beerwah Bulldogs and Gympie Devils in Sunshine Coast, Queensland.

The season closed with a second tour of the year, this time to Toulouse, where they drew 22–22 against Villeneuve Tolosane.

==== Season's Record ====
First Grade

National League 3

- 01/05/2004 Manchester Knights 12 South London Storm 28
- 08/05/2004 South London Storm 18 Bradford Dudley Hill 15
- 22/05/2004 South London Storm 26 Birmingham Bulldogs 14
- 29/05/2004 St Albans Centurions 30 South London Storm 22
- 31/05/2004 South London Storm 54 Essex Eels 18
- 05/06/2004 Sheffield Hillsborough Hawks 26 South London Storm 18
- 12/06/2004 South London Storm 26 Bramley Buffaloes 20
- 26/06/2004 Coventry Bears 46 South London Storm 14
- 03/07/2004 Gateshead Storm 20 South London Storm 32
- 10/07/2004 South London Storm v Woolston Rovers (Warrington) (Match abandoned)
- 17/07/2004 Huddersfield Underbank Rangers 24 South London Storm 24
- 24/07/2004 South London Storm 36 Carlisle Centurions 16
- 31/07/2004 Birmingham Bulldogs 32 South London Storm 30
- 07/08/2004 South London Storm 20 St Albans Centurions 24
- 14/08/2004 Essex Eels 14 South London Storm 54
- 21/08/2004 South London Storm 34 Sheffield Hillsborough Hawks 35
- 28/08/2004 Bramley Buffaloes 32 South London Storm 18
- 30/08/2004 Hemel Stags 54 South London Storm 6
- 04/09/2004 South London Storm 12 Hemel Stags 38
- 11/09/2004 South London Storm 18 Coventry Bears 28

	Pld	W	D	L	F	A
Home	9*	5	0	4	244	208
Away	10	3	1	6	246	290

- Home match versus Woolston Rovers (Warrington) abandoned due to an injury.

Second Grade

Rugby League Conference South

- 01/05/2004 Kingston Warriors 58 South London Storm 0
- 08/05/2004 South London Storm 20 Gosport & Fareham Vikings 22
- 22/05/2004 West London Sharks 54 South London Storm 16
- 05/06/2004 Greenwich Admirals 46 South London Storm 6
- 12/06/2004 South London Storm 24 Kingston Warriors 42
- 19/06/2004 Gosport & Fareham Vikings 46 South London Storm 12
- 26/06/2004 South London Storm 0 West London Sharks 88
- 03/07/2004 South London Storm 10 Greenwich Admirals 44

	Pld	W	D	L	F	A
Home	4	0	0	4	54	196
Away	4	0	0	4	34	194

=== 2005 ===
As the cost of travelling to places as far afield as Carlisle and Gateshead began to spiral, Storm took the decision to apply for, and were admitted to, the newly created RLC South Premier for the 2005 season and appointed Rob Powell as Director of Coaching. The season proved to be a success with the club winning its first round Rugby League Challenge Cup match against West London Sharks (24–20) in front of a crowd of 1,000. However, the Powergen Challenge Cup run came to an end in the second round when they were beaten 50–24 at Castleford Lock Lane, despite having surprising led at half-time.

During the RLC South Premier campaign the first team dominated the group and won all but one game during the season. The team lost in the national semi-final against Bridgend Blue Bulls, the competition's eventual winners, but the season ended on a high by beating the other 85 clubs to the RLC Club of the Year award for the 2nd time in 4 years.

==== Season's Record ====
First Grade

Rugby League Conference Premier South

- 07/05/2005 South London Storm 82 Ipswich Rhinos 6
- 14/05/2005 London Skolars A 0 South London Storm 64
- 21/05/2005 South London Storm 72 Sunderland Nissan 6
- 28/05/2005 South London Storm 46 Greenwich Admirals 0
- 04/06/2005 Luton Vipers 4 South London Storm 68
- 11/06/2005 South London Storm 52 West London Sharks 14
- 18/06/2005 Sunderland Nissan 4 South London Storm 76
- 25/06/2005 Ipswich Rhinos 16 South London Storm 24
- 02/07/2005 South London Storm 94 London Skolars A 4
- 09/07/2005 Greenwich Admirals 4 South London Storm 76
- 16/07/2005 South London Storm vs Luton Vipers – Won: Walkover
- 23/07/2005 West London Sharks 46 South London Storm 10

	Pld	W	D	L	F	A
Home	5*	5	0	0	346	30
Away	6	5	0	1	318	74

- Luton Vipers forfeit a fixture

RLC Premier Play Offs

- 30/07/2005 South London Storm 70 West London Sharks 6 (Divisional Play Off)
- 13/08/2005 South London Storm 24 West London Sharks 8 (Divisional Final)
- 21/08/2005 Bridgend Blue Bulls 34 South London Storm 18 (National Semi-Final)

	Pld	W	D	L	F	A
Home	2	2	0	0	94	14
Neutral	1	0	0	1	18	34

Second Grade

Rugby League Conference South

- 07/05/2005 South London Storm 28 Hemel Stags 36
- 21/05/2005 South London Storm 38 West London 52
- 28/05/2005 Haringey Hornets 50 South London Storm 12
- 04/06/2005 Kingston Warriors 41 South London Storm 18
- 11/06/2005 Hemel Stags 42 South London Storm 18
- 25/06/2005 West London Sharks 46 South London Storm 16
- 02/07/2005 South London Storm 18 Haringey Hornets 48
- 09/07/2005 South London Storm 6 Kingston Warriors 100

	Pld	W	D	L	F	A
Home	4	0	0	4	88	236
Away	4	0	0	4	66	179

=== 2006 ===
The 2006 summer season was to be the most successful for South London Storm as a club, with both senior teams winning their leagues, successes for the 4 Storm youth clubs, and the first team being crowned RLC National Champions.

Despite pressure from the Ipswich Rhinos, Storm once again won the South division of the RLC Premier. After disposing of the Bridgend team in the semi-final, they crushed the East Lancashire Lions in the final at Broadstreet RUFC by 30 points to nil.

This rounded off a successful season that included the London League title for the second team who defeated Luton Vipers in the Final.

==== Season's Record ====
First Grade

Rugby League Conference Premier South

- 29/04/2006 South London Storm 54 West London Sharks 24
- 06/05/2006 South London Storm 30 Coventry Bears 18
- 13/05/2006 South London Storm 34 Haringey Hornets 28
- 20/05/2006 Essex Eels 6 South London Storm 68
- 27/05/2006 South London Storm 46 Kingston Warriors 18
- 10/06/2006 Ipswich Rhinos 32 South London Storm 14
- 17/06/2006 West London Sharks 34 South London Storm 24
- 24/06/2006 Coventry Bears 28 South London Storm 32
- 01/07/2006 Haringey Hornets 30 South London Storm 34
- 08/07/2006 South London Storm 80 Kingston Warriors 12
- 29/07/2006 South London Storm 46 Ipswich Rhinos 8

	Pld	W	D	L	F	A
Home	6	6	0	0	290	108
Away	5	3	0	2	172	130

RLC Premier Play Offs

- 12/08/2006 South London Storm 52 Ipswich Rhinos 10 (Divisional Final)
- 20/08/2006 South London Storm 32 Bridgend Blue Bulls 12 (National Semi-Final)
- 03/09/2006 East Lancashire Lions 0 South London Storm 30 (Jepson Trophy Final)

	Pld	W	D	L	F	A
Home	1	1	0	0	52	10
Neutral	2	2	0	0	62	12

Second Grade

London League

- 29/04/2006 South London Storm 66 West London Sharks 22
- 06/05/2006 West London Sharks 36 South London Storm 20
- 13/05/2006 Bedford Tigers 16 South London Storm 32
- 20/05/2006 Southend Seaxes 14 South London Storm 40
- 27/05/2006 Kentish Tigers 24 South London Storm 33
- 17/06/2006 West London Sharks 38 South London Storm 38
- 24/06/2006 Luton Vipers 54 South London Storm 6
- 08/07/2006 Smallford Saints 40 South London Storm 38
- 22/07/2006 South London Storm 38 West London Sharks 26

	Pld	W	D	L	F	A
Home	2	2	0	0	104	48
Away	7	3	1	3	197	222

London League Play Offs

- 06/08/2006 South London Storm 44 Bedford Tigers 14 (Semi-Final)
- 12/06/2006 South London Storm 52 Luton Vipers 20 (Final)

	Pld	W	D	L	F	A
Home	2	2	0	0	96	34

=== 2007 ===
After the success of the previous season, 2007 was a tough year. Coach Rob Powell moved on to Super League's Harlequins RL, and was replaced by Andy Gilvary and Dave Wilson.

The season kicked off with a Challenge Cup First Round game away to Thornhill Trojans, but playing out of season the Londoners were no match for the National Conference League Premier Division side and lost 18–58.

==== Season's Record ====
First Grade

Rugby League Conference Premier South

- 14/04/2007 West London Sharks 16 South London Storm 56
- 28/04/2007 South London Storm 26 St Albans Centurions 22
- 12/05/2007 South London Storm 18 Ipswich Rhinos 4
- 19/05/2007 West London Sharks 28 South London Storm 32
- 26/05/2007 London Skolars A 26 South London Storm 42
- 02/06/2007 South London Storm 74 Kent Ravens 2
- 09/06/2007 South London Storm 22 London Skolars 22
- 16/06/2007 South London Storm vs Kingston Warriors – Won: Walkover
- 30/06/2007 Ipswich Rhinos 25 South London Storm 24
- 07/07/2007 South London Storm 36 West London Sharks 18
- 15/07/2007 St Albans Centurions 32 South London Storm 16
- 21/07/2007 Kent Ravens 0 South London Storm 66
- 28/07/2007 South London Storm 32 London Skolars A 33
- 04/08/2007 South London Storm 56 Kingston Warriors 22

	Pld	W	D	L	F	A
Home	7	5	1	1	264	123
Away	6	4	0	2	236	127

RLC Premier Play Offs

- 11/08/2007 South London Storm 48 London Skolars 24 (Divisional Semi-Final)
- 18/08/2007 South London Storm 10 St Albans Centurions 18 (Divisional Final)

	Pld	W	D	L	F	A
Home	1	1	0	0	48	24
Neutral	1	0	0	1	10	18

Second Grade

London League

- 28/04/2007 South London Storm 22 London Griffins 38
- 12/05/2007 South London Storm 26 Southgate Skolars 29
- 19/05/2007 West London Sharks 56 South London Storm 14
- 02/06/2007 South London Storm 82 Kent Ravens 10
- 16/06/2007 South London Storm 42 Smallford Saints 18
- 23/06/2007 Farnborough Falcons 40 South London Storm 28
- 07/07/2007 South London Storm 18 West London Sharks 24
- 14/07/2007 Southgate Skolars 72 South London Storm 6
- 21/07/2007 Kent Ravens 18 South London Storm 30

	Pld	W	D	L	F	A
Home	5	2	0	3	190	119
Away	4	1	0	3	78	186

London League Play Offs

- 04/08/2007 St Albans Centurions 40 South London Storm 22 (Quarter-Final)

	Pld	W	D	L	F	A
Away	1	0	0	1	22	40

=== 2008 ===
Storm once again reached the RLC Premier South Grand Final but were defeated 20–24 by West London Sharks, with the game-breaking try coming two minutes from the end of the match.

==== Season's Record ====
First Grade

Rugby League Conference Premier South

- 19/04/2008 Ipswich Rhinos 32 South London Storm 12
- 03/05/2008 St Albans Centurions 32 South London Storm 12
- 10/05/2008 South London Storm 22 West London Sharks 48
- 17/05/2008 London Skolars 12 South London Storm 30
- 24/05/2008 US Portsmouth 22 South London Storm 16
- 07/06/2008 South London Storm 70 Elmbridge 8
- 14/06/2008 South London Storm 36 Ipswich Rhinos 16
- 21/06/2008 South London Storm 42 St Albans Centurions 10
- 28/06/2008 West London Sharks 38 South London Storm 10
- 05/07/2008 South London Storm 44 London Skolars 12
- 12/07/2008 South London Storm 58 US Portsmouth 14
- 26/07/2008 Elmbridge 22 South London Storm 58

	Pld	W	D	L	F	A
Home	6	5	0	1	272	108
Away	6	2	0	4	138	158

RLC Premier Play Offs

- 09/08/2008 South London Storm 20 Ipswich Rhinos 14 (Divisional Semi-Final)
- 16/08/2008 West London Sharks 24 South London Storm 20 (Divisional Final)

	Pld	W	D	L	F	A
Home	1	1	0	0	20	14
Away	1	0	0	1	22	24

Second Grade

London League

- 03/05/2008 St Albans Centurions 14 South London Storm 12
- 10/05/2008 South London Storm 24 West London Sharks 42
- 17/05/2008 Southgate Skolars 12 South London Storm 16
- 07/06/2008 Kent Ravens 54 South London Storm 42
- 28/06/2008 West London Sharks 62 South London Storm 14
- 14/07/2008 South London Storm 48 Southampton Spitfires 18
- 12/07/2008 Feltham YOI 52 South London Storm 64
- 23/07/2008 South London Storm 26 Metropolitan Police 34
- 26/07/2008 South London Storm 34 Kent Ravens 30

	Pld	W	D	L	F	A
Home	4	2	0	2	132	124
Away	5	2	0	3	148	194

London League Play Offs

- 02/08/2008 Southampton Spitfires 44 South London Storm 20 (Quarter-Final)

	Pld	W	D	L	F	A
Away	1	0	0	1	20	44

=== 2009 ===
Storm will again participate in the Premier South Division of the RLC. Their opposing teams will be Bedford Tigers, Elmbridge, Hainault Bulldogs, Ipswich Rhinos, London Skolars A, St Albans Centurions, Portsmouth Navy Seahawks and West London Sharks.

==== Season's Record ====
First Grade

Rugby League Conference Premier South

- 13/04/09 London Skolars 22 South London Storm 54
- 25/04/09 Elmbridge 10 South London Storm 54
- 02/05/09 Portsmouth Navy Seahawks 24 South London Storm 80
- 09/05/09 South London Storm 66 Hainault Bulldogs 4
- 16/05/09 South London Storm 102 Bedford Tigers 12
- 23/05/09 St Albans Centurions 20 South London Storm 48
- 30/05/09 South London Storm 56 London Skolars 18
- 06/06/09 West London Sharks 8 South London Storm 24
- 13/06/09 Ipswich Rhinos 14 South London Storm 26
- 27/06/09 South London Storm 73 Portsmouth Navy Seahawks 30
- 04/07/09 Bedford Tigers vs South London Storm – Won: Walkover
- 11/07/09 South London Storm 40 St Albans Centurions 10
- 18/07/09 South London Storm 40 West London Sharks 30
- 25/07/09 South London Storm vs Ipswich Rhinos – Won: Walkover

	Pld	W	D	L	F	A
Home	6*	6	0	0	380	84
Away	6*	6	0	0	286	114

- Bedford Tigers and Ipswich Rhinos each forfeit a fixture.

RLC Premier Play Offs

- 15/08/09 South London Storm 58 Ipswich Rhinos 12 (Divisional Semi-Final)
- 22/08/09 South London Storm 16 West London Sharks 26 (Divisional Final)

	Pld	W	D	L	F	A
Home	2	1	0	1	74	38

Second Grade

London League

- 25/04/09 Guildford Giants 20 South London Storm 28
- 16/05/09 South London Storm 6 Hammersmith Hills Hoists 54
- 23/05/09 St Albans Centurions 10 South London Storm 56
- 06/06/09 West London Sharks 34 South London Storm 36
- 24/06/09 Hammersmith Hills Hoists 64 South London Storm 14
- 27/06/09 South London Storm 48 Sussex Merlins 34
- 25/07/09 South London Storm 66 Hemel Stags 14
- 02/08/09 Sussex Merlins 40 South London Storm 34

	Pld	W	D	L	F	A
Home	3	2	0	1	120	102
Away	5	2	0	3	166	170

London League Play Offs

- 16/08/09 Hemel Stags 24 South London Storm 16 (Semi-Final)

	Pld	W	D	L	F	A
Away	1	0	0	1	16	24

Academy Grade

- 18/04/09 Kent Ravens 18 South London Storm 28
- 25/04/09 South London Storm 40 Medway Dragons 6
- 09/05/09 South London Storm 40 Greenwich Admirals 16
- 06/06/09 Medway Dragons 22 South London Storm 20
- 18/07/09 South London Storm 46 Greenwich Admirals 26 (Final at Staines RFC)

	Pld	W	D	L	F	A
Home	2	2	0	0	80	22
Away	3	2	0	1	94	66

=== 2010 ===
==== Season's Record ====
First Grade

Rugby League Conference Premier South

- 01/05/10 West London Sharks 34 South London Storm 20
- 08/05/10 South London Storm vs Portsmouth Navy Seahawks – Won: Walkover
- 15/05/10 Hainault Bulldogs 34 South London Storm 28
- 22/05/10 South London Storm 56 Eastern Rhinos 10
- 29/05/10 St Albans Centurions 36 South London Storm 4
- 05/06/10 Hammersmith Hillhoists 36 South London Storm 32
- 19/06/10 South London Storm 38 London Skolars 6
- 26/06/10 South London Storm 16 West London Sharks 58
- 03/07/10 South London Storm 48 Portsmouth Navy Seahawks 28
- 10/07/10 South London Storm 50 Hainaut Bulldogs 42
- 17/07/10 Eastern Rhinos 30 South London Storm 22
- 24/07/10 South London Storm 6 St Albans Centurions 60
- 31/07/10 South London Storm 18 Hammersmith Hillhoists 52
- 07/08/10 London Skolars vs South London Storm – Won: Walkover

	Pld	W	D	L	F	A
Home	7*	4	0	3	232	256
Away	5*	0	0	5	108	170

- Not including games forfeited by Portsmouth (h) and London Skolars (a).

Second Grade

Rugby League Conference

- 01/05/10 South London Storm 40 Guildford Giants 22
- 08/05/10 South London Storm 40 Southampton Spitfires 14
- 15/05/10 South London Storm 54 Sussex Merlins 22
- 22/05/10 Elmbridge Eagles 90 South London Storm 4
- 05/06/09 South London Storm 98 Swindon St George 0
- 09/06/10 Greenwich Admirals 14 South London Storm 16
- 12/06/10 Oxford Cavaliers 24 South London Storm 40
- 19/06/10 Guildford Giants 62 South London Storm 12
- 26/06/10 Southampton Spitfires vs South London Storm – Lost: Walkover
- 03/07/10 Sussex Merlins 50 South London Storm 20
- 10/07/10 South London Storm 4 Elmbridge Eagles 72
- 17/07/10 South London Storm 6 Greenwich Admirals 64
- 24/07/10 Swindon St George vs South London Storm – Lost: Walkover
- 31/07/10 South London Storm vs Oxford Cavaliers – Won: Walkover

	Pld	W	D	L	F	A
Home	6	4	0	2	242	194
Away	5	2	0	3	92	240

=== 2011 ===
==== Season's Record ====
First Grade

Rugby League Conference Premier South

- 30/04/11 South London Storm 26 St Albans Centurions 32
- 07/05/11 Eastern Rhinos 46 South London Storm 14
- 14/05/11 West London Sharks 28 South London Storm 18
- 21/05/11 Hainault Bulldogs 14 South London Storm 40
- 04/06/11 Hammersmith Hills Hoists 30 South London Storm 6
- 11/06/11 St Albans Centurions 46 South London Storm 10
- 28/06/11 South London Storm 22 Eastern Rhinos 32 (@ St Albans)
- 25/06/11 South London Storm 24 West London Sharks 22
- 02/07/11 South London Storm 32 London Skolars 18
- 09/07/11 South London Storm 18 Hammersmith Hills Hoists 62
- 16/07/11 South London Storm 24 Eastern Rhinos 42
- 23/07/11 South London Storm 20 West London Sharks 22
- 30/07/11 Hammersmith Hills Hoists vs South London Storm

	Pld	W	D	L	F	A
Home	6	2	0	4	144	196
Away	5	1	0	4	88	164
Neutral	1	0	0	1	22	32

Second Grade

London League

- 07/05/11 London Skolars 'A' 56 South London Storm 16
- 21/05/11 Phantoms RL 4 South London Storm 70
- 04/06/11 Hammersmith Hills Hoists 'A' 60 South London Storm 20
- 18/06/11 St Albans Centurions 'A' 24 South London Storm 10
- 18/06/11 Bedford Tigers 'A' 16 South London Storm 10 (@ St Albans)
- 25/06/11 South London Storm 0 Mudchute Uncles 28
- 09/07/11 South London Storm 18 Hammersmith Hills Hoists 'A' 36
- 16/07/11 South London Storm vs Hemel Stags 'A'
- 23/07/11 South London Storm vs Greenwich Admirals 'A'
- 30/07/11 Hammersmith Hills Hoists 'A' vs South London Storm

	Pld	W	D	L	F	A
Home	2	0	0	2	18	64
Away	4	1	0	3	116	144
Neutral	1	0	0	1	10	16

=== Challenge Cup Record ===
- 29/11/2003 South London Storm 4 West Bowling 36 (1st Round)
- 05/02/2005 South London Storm 24 West London Sharks 20 (1st Round)
- 19/02/2005 Castleford Lock Lane 50 South London Storm 24 (2nd Round)
- 03/02/2007 Thornhill Trojans 58 South London Storm 18 (1st Round)
