= London Griffins =

Club information
- Full name: London Griffins RLFC
- Colours: Black with Red and Gold
- Founded: 2005
- Website: http://www.londongriffins.co.uk

Current details
- Ground: Grasshoppers Rugby Club, Osterley
- Competition: Rugby League Conference (from 2007)

London Griffins RLFC is a rugby league club based in west London, England. The club play semi and full contact rugby league against opponents in London and throughout the UK. The club is open to all ages and standards and has attracted many who have never even played the sport before.

== Foundation ==
London Griffins were formed in March 2005 as the supporters team of London Broncos and are now the Harlequins RL supporters team. The club was formed as a social team to play against other such supporters teams.

The Griffins name came from the London Broncos former home ground at Griffin Park. The ground took its name from the Griffin in the logo of Fuller's Brewery, which at one point owned the land on which the stadium was built. The nearby Griffin pub was a popular meeting place for fans before and after London Broncos home games.

== Season 2005 ==
2005 was the Griffins first season and saw the club finding its feet under coach Paul Curley. All games were semi contact and played away as the club did not yet have a home ground.

On 28 June 2005, barely three months after its formation, the club played its first game against Kingston Warriors. The team battled well in a 34–12 defeat with Rob Douglas creating history when he dived over for the first ever Griffins try.

The next game saw the club notch its first victory with a 52–19 win at Kent Ravens on 17 July 2005. Simon Bashorun scored a lung-bursting long range try (which was later voted try of the season) but Chris Heading was Griffins man of the match scoring 3 tries and converting 8 from 9 goal attempts.

On 14 August 2005, the team took a step up in terms of quality of opposition and intensity against a South London Storm side including many first team players. Storm were 44–22 winners in a competitive game. Griffins man of the match was Matt King.

Next up was a trip to St Albans to face St Albans Centurions Old Boys on 10 September 2005. This proved to be a very close-fought game. In appalling heavy rain the game was tied at 22–22 with just minutes to go. However, a series of Griffins handling errors gave the Centurions the initiative and they took the lead with just a minute on the clock. A failed short kick off gifted another score to the opposition who took the victory by 32–22. Griffins man of the match was shared this between Jason Dunn, who controlled the game admirably in the centre of the pitch, and Chris Caulfield who defended superbly and looked dangerous in attack.

In its final 13 a side game of its first season, Griffins went back to South London Storm on 25 September 2005 looking for revenge. The team performed very well to win 26–18 against a side including some much more experienced professional players. Griffins showed great skill while inspired leadership from Bill Drinkwater and Dell Bristow saw the team victorious in an intense battle.

== 2005 Hull IMBRL 7's ==
In the final action of the 2005 season London Griffins travelled to Hull on 23 October 2005 for the Hull IMBRL 7's tournament.

The Griffins got off to a poor start with successive group stage defeats to York and Castleford but recovered well to take the scalp of the Leeds Lost Loiners. The final group game saw a comfortable victory over Sheffield Forgers which earned a place in the plate competition.

In the plate, Oldham were beaten in the quarter-finals and the Hull side Dads Against Drugs were beaten in a nail biting semi final. The final was against Halifax and Griffins were always ahead in close game finally winning by 6 tries to 5.

So a successful first season ended on a high with the club's first silverware as plate winners of the 2005 Hull IMBRL 7's.

== 2006 Sheffield IMBRL 7's ==
The 2006 season opened on 1 May 2006 with the Sheffield IMBRL 7's, a tag competition organised by Sheffield Forgers.

The group stages saw the Griffins drawn with St Thomas, Halifax B, Hull B and Sheffield A.

St Thomas were beaten 3 tries to 1 and Sheffield A by 7 tries to 1 in a game that featured a hat-trick from Craig Johnson. The first big test came against Hull FC Irregulars and the London side romped home by 5 tries to 1 including another hat-trick this time from King. The group stage ended with a 6–4 win against Halifax B where Matt King once again crossed for three tries.

The semi final was a tense and epic encounter with Halifax A with the Griffins victorious by 7 tries to 5. Craig Johnson matched Matt King by scoring a second hat-trick of the day. It was defence that had been the key with Chris Heading leading the way.

Sheffield B were to be the final opponents. After a tight first half the Griffins pulled away to score a 7 tries to 4 victory with Maurice Harley (2), Chris Heading, Steve Farrar, Jason Dunn and Rob Douglas all registering tries.

== Season 2006 ==
The 13-a-side season opened with a semi contact game against Sheffield Forgers on 21 May 2006. The game was played at the New River Stadium as a curtain raiser to the National League Two clash between London Skolars and Sheffield Eagles. Griffins led 22–12 at half time and with 15 minutes remaining had extended this lead to 38–18. Three quick tries in a late fightback from the Forgers put the home side under pressure but the Griffins were able to hang on during a nervy finish to claim a 38–32 victory. Griffins man of the match was shared by Dell Bristow and Dan Stapleton

On 1 July 2006, a significant development for the club saw the Griffins playing their first full contact match against Wigan Web Warriors. The game was also the first played at the Griffins' new home ground of London Grasshoppers. On the day, Wigan's experience told in very hot conditions and they were victors by 38–14.

Encouraged by the full contact experience the club applied to join the London Amateur Rugby League for the 2007 season. A new coaching team of Adam Hill (head coach) and Chris Heading (conditioner) was put in place to prepare the team for this transition.

Back on the field, the rivalry started in 2005 with South London Storm continued with a further match on 13 August 2006. In their biggest win to date, the Griffins outclassed a select Storm side to win 52–8. The whole team put in a great performance and debutants Leon Hook (2), Mark Price and Jamie Robinson all scored tries. Joint man of the match were the new coaching team of Chris Heading and Adam Hill.

== Season 2007 ==
After only one London League fixture, a 38–22 win at South London Storm, London Griffins joined Rugby League Conference South division. The Griffins were approached by the RFL to take over Broadstairs' fixtures after they withdrew from the Conference.
