= Adam Janowski =

English rugby league footballer

Personal information
- Full name: Adam Janowski
- Born: 19 September 1987 (age 38) London, England

Playing information
- Position: Prop
Club
Years	Team	Pld	T	G	FG	P
2008	Harlequins RL	1	0	0	0	0
- Source: As of 1 January 2009

Adam Janowski (/jəˈnɒfski/; born 19 September 1987, in London) is a former professional rugby league footballer for Harlequins RL in the Super League. He played as a prop. He made his début and only appearance for the club against Leeds Rhinos in Round 17 of the 2008 Super League season.

Janowski started out as a junior at the South London Storm. Whilst at Storm he represented England U15s against the Welsh.
