= London and South East Rugby League =

Rugby league competition for amateur teams

- Sport: Rugby league
- Formerly known as: RLC Southern Premier
- Instituted: 2005
- Country: England
- Champions: Wests Warriors A (2024)

The London and South East Rugby League is a summer rugby league competition for amateur teams in London and the surrounding area. The competition was formed in 2005 as the RLC Southern Premier. Its name changed following the 2012 restructure of amateur rugby league in Great Britain.

== History ==
The Rugby League Conference was born in 1997 as the Southern Conference.

The Premier Division was set up in 2005 for teams who had achieved a certain playing standard and were able to travel further afield to find stronger opposition. The new Premier Divisions included the North Premier, the South Premier, the Central Premier and the Welsh Premier.

Prior to the 2005 season National League Three side South London Storm announced that they were joining the South Premier; the other founder members came from the Conference regional divisions.

After the 2006 season with other teams withdrawing from National League Three, St Albans Centurions also decided to join the Premier South.

In 2012 it became a standalone league run by the RFL with the introduction of Summer Rugby in the amateur ranks. St Albans Centurions returned to playing nationally in National Conference League Division Three

It has a merit league attached to it enabling smaller clubs to develop before entering the league to see if they are able to meet the demands of player numbers and competing fixtures throughout a regular season. Some larger clubs have fielded an A team in this league to bolster numbers and create opportunities for less experienced players to play.

== Position in Pyramid ==
- 1: Super League
- 2: Championship
- 3–5: National Community Rugby League
- 6: London and South East Rugby League

== Clubs ==
As of 2024: Brighton & Hove RL, Brixton Bulls, Elmbridge Eagles, London Chargers, Medway Dragons, Wests Warriors A.

In 2025: Anglian Vipers, Brixton Bulls, Elmbridge Eagles, Hemel Stags, London Skolars, Medway Dragons

== League Standings from 2005 to 2013 ==
Teams	2005	2006	2007	2008	2009	2010	2011	2012	2013
Bedford Tigers	x	x	x	x	6th	x	x	x	x
Eastern Rhinos	3rd	2nd	5th	3rd	4th	4th	3rd	3rd	4th
Elmbridge Eagles ^{2}	x	5th	6th	7th	9th	x	x	5th	6th
Essex Eels	x	DNF	x	x	x	x	x	x	x
Greenwich Admirals	6th	x	x	x	x	x	x	x	x
Hainault Bulldogs	x	x	x	x	8th	6th	DNF	x	x
Hammersmith Hills Hoists	x	x	x	x	x	2nd	1st	2nd	1st
Hemel Stags A	x	x	x	x	x	x	x	x	5th
Kent Ravens	x	x	7th	DNF	x	x	x	x	x
London Skolars A ^{3}	4th	4th	3rd	6th	7th	8th	5th^{5}	1st	3rd
Luton Vipers	5th	DNF	x	x	x	x	x	x	x
Portsmouth Navy Seahawks	x	x	x	5th	5th	7th	x	x	x
St Albans Centurions	x	x	1st	4th	3rd	1st	2nd	x	x
South London Storm	1st	1st	2nd	2nd	1st	5th	6th	4th	x
South West London Chargers^{4}	x	x	x	x	x	x	x	x	2nd
West London Sharks	2nd	3rd	4th	1st	2nd	3rd	4th	DNF	x

- ^{1} competed as Ipswich Rhinos between 2005 and 2009
- ^{2} competed as Kingston Warriors between 2005 and 2007 and Elmbridge in 2008.
- ^{3} competed as Haringey Hornets in 2006
- ^{4} a merger of South London Storm and West London Sharks
- ^{5} midseason replacements for Hainault Bulldogs

=== Key ===
DNF	Did not complete the season
x	Did not participate
	Divisional winner
	Qualified for divisional play-off
	Finished bottom

== Grand Finals ==
Source from 2017

Year	Winners	Score	Runners-up	Venue
2005	South London Storm	24–8	West London Sharks	Storm Park
2006	South London Storm	52–10	Ipswich Rhinos	Storm Park
2007	St Albans Centurions	18–10	South London Storm	Twickenham Stoop
2008	West London Sharks	24–20	South London Storm	Grasshoppers RFC
2009	West London Sharks	26–16	South London Storm	Storm Park
2010	St Albans Centurions	54–4	West London Sharks	Cotlandswick
2011	Hammersmith Hills Hoists	18–16	St Albans Centurions	Hemel Hempstead
2012	Hammersmith Hills Hoists	46–8	Eastern Rhinos	
2013	South West London Chargers	20–10	Hammersmith Hills Hoists	Chiswick RFC
2014	South West London Chargers	46–6	Eastern Rhinos	Wasps RFC
2015	South West London Chargers	32–12	London Skolars A	Old Blues RFC
2016	Brixton Bulls		Richmond Warriors	
2017	Hammersmith Hills Hoists	25–18	London Chargers	New River Stadium
2018	Hammersmith Hills Hoists	20–8	London Chargers	
2019	Wests Warriors A	38–22	London Skolars A	New River Stadium
2020	No competition due to the COVID-19 pandemic			
2021	Medway Dragons	38–18	Brixton Bulls	Rosslyn Park RFC
2022	Brixton Bulls	34–30	Elmbridge Eagles	New River Stadium
2023	London Chargers A	38–16	Medway Dragons	New River Stadium
2024	Wests Warriors A	24–20	Brixton Bulls	Wasps FC, Twyford Avenue
2025	Medway Dragons	36-18	Elmbridge Eagles	Medway Dragons

== Titles ==
London Men's League Champions
Position	Team	Number of Wins	Years
1 =	Hammersmith Hills Hoists	4	2011, 2012, 2017, 2018
1 =	London Chargers	4	2013, 2014, 2015, 2023
3 =	Brixton Bulls	2	2016, 2022
3 =	St Albans Centurions	2	2007, 2010
3 =	West London Sharks	2	2008, 2009
3 =	South London Storm	2	2005, 2006
3 =	Wests Warriors	2	2019, 2024
3 =	Medway Dragons	2	2021, 2025

== London Cup ==
- 2013: South West London Chargers

== Harry Jepson Trophy games ==
Ceased 2011. Revived 2021

Year	Game	RLC Southern Premier Team	Result	Opponent	Venue
2005	Semi-final	South London Storm	18–34	Bridgend Blue Bulls	Cheltenham
2006	Semi-final	South London Storm	32–12	Bridgend Blue Bulls	Hemel
2006	Grand Final	South London Storm	30–0	East Lancs Lions	Coventry
2007	Semi-final	St Albans Centurions	42–16	Bridgend Blue Bulls	
2007	Grand Final	St Albans Centurions	28–20	Coventry Bears	
2008	Semi-final	West London Sharks	32–30	Valley Cougars	
2008	Grand Final	West London Sharks	8–28	Nottingham Outlaws	Derby

== See also ==
- British rugby league system
