= Crewe & Nantwich Steamers =

English amateur rugby league club

Club information
- Full name: Crewe & Nantwich Steamers RLFC
- Founded: 2003; 23 years ago

Current details
- Ground: Barony Park, Nantwich
- Competition: Rugby League Conference North West Division and North West Merit League

Crewe & Nantwich Steamers is a rugby league club in Nantwich, Cheshire. They play in the North West Division of the Rugby League Conference and run a second team in the North West Merit League.

== History ==
Crewe Wolves entered the Northern Division of the Rugby League Conference in 1999 playing their first season at Crewe & Nantwich RUFC before moving away.

Crewe and Nantwich Steamers RL started in early 2003 as a junior colts team with some senior players. Crewe and Nantwich Steamers and Crewe Wolves joined to create one senior and one colts team under one club, this lasted until 2007 when Crewe and Nantwich Steamers left to create senior and colts sides in their own right. Steamers' senior side's first game was against Sheffield Forgers where the steamers were narrowly beaten.

The Steamers' first full season in 2008 saw them finish in the top six of the RL Merit League playing at the Legends Ground in Crewe, but the Steamers were not able to compete in the knock-out stages of the competition.

In 2009 the Steamers moved away from Crewe to Barony Park, Nantwich. They lost the first Cheshire Challenge Cup final to Chester Gladiators.

Steamers joined the North West division of the Rugby League Conference for the 2010 season, they also started an A-team which joined the North West Merit League.

Crewe & Nantwich Steamers failed to complete the 2011 season in the North West regional division.
