= Greenwich Admirals =

English rugby league club, based in London

Club information
- Full name: Greenwich Admirals Rugby League Football Club
- Founded: 2001; 25 years ago
- Website: www.greenwichrl.com (dead)

Current details
- Ground: Mayday Gardens
- Competition: Rugby League Conference South Premier

Greenwich Admirals is a rugby league team based in Greenwich, London. They play in the South Premier of the Rugby League Conference.

== History ==
The Greenwich Admirals side was founded in 2001 as the brainchild of Chief Executive of the London Broncos' Lionel Hurst and under the guidance of development officer Graeme Thompson. Greenwich Admirals were to continue the Broncos' development work in the area after the Broncos moved away from southeast London to a new home in Brentford.

An introductory game was played on 11 August 2001 against South London Storm, the Admirals team being made up of rugby union players from Old Brockleians RFC and Greenwich RFC and players borrowed from Storm; Greenwich won 28 - 24.

Jason Henley was recruited as Head Coach and in February 2002, the club was formally set up with a committee, constitution and club rules. Greenwich made it to the 2002 London League grand final in their inaugural season. The final against Crawley Jets held at Crawley, was won 38 - 22.

Greenwich Admirals joined the London & South Division of the Rugby League Conference in 2003 whilst a Greenwich Admirals second team took part in the London League. The first team won more games than it lost, finally finding form at the end of the season with victories over South London Storm, North London Skolars A and Essex Eels on the way to the RLC Shield quarter-finals. The second team reached the semi-finals of the London League play-offs.

The club moved to the Woolwich Barracks Rugby Fields in 2004. Greenwich lost only one game all year on the way to the South Divisional Final. Greenwich went down to a West London Sharks side led by Trevor Leota in the final.

In 2005, the Conference developed a new tier of Premier Divisions, Greenwich Admirals stepped up to the newly created Premier South. The club was thrown into turmoil as it lost its coaching team because of outside issues. The club lost senior players and had to be replaced by second team and junior players. The season closed with the team finishing bottom of the table.

Greenwich left the Premier South and joined the South East Division of the Conference. The club relocated again to Mayday Gardens. Greenwich beat Kent Ravens in a play-off eliminator to set up a grand finale against new boys Broadstairs Bulldogs which they lost.

In 2007, the first team finished third in their division on points difference and were eliminated at the semi-final stage of the divisional play-offs.

In 2009 Greenwich Admirals youth section had a very successful year. The under-14s reached the final but lost to Elmbridge Eagles in what was seen as a one-sided encounter. The under-16s reached the semi-finals but were also edged out 36-12 by Elmbridge Eagles. The under-18s, who were only formed in the 2009 season, also reached the final but lost to South London Storm Academy.

== Youth teams ==
Greenwich Admirals run youth age groups in the London Junior League from under-14s all the way up to under-18s, giving the first team exposure to youth talent.

Greenwich Admirals' youth section, is renowned for producing good players. This was shown in 2009 when Jacko Brennan and Gary Sergeant were both selected in the 32-man England squad for games against France and the Australian Institute Of Sport.

In 2010 both the under-16 and under-18 teams became London champions beating Hainault and Medway in their respective finals. Greenwich Admirals now play their games in Kidbrooke Lane, Eltham, at Blackheath FC Well Hall ground.

== Club honours ==
- London League: 2002
- London League Plate: 2004
- RLC London & South Division: 2009, 2010
