= Tydfil Wildcats Rugby League =

Tydfil Wildcats Rugby League is a Rugby league club based in Merthyr Tydfil. The club colours are yellow and blue. The home ground was the cage in Troedyrhiw until September 2010 but relocated for the 2011 season to Dowlais RFC. The Wildcats play in the Wales Rugby League conference.

== History ==
Summer season 2008 The club started with two teams. Under 13s and Under 15s. The first match played by the club was a close match between at Under 15s between Cardiff Demons and Tydfil Wildcats. On the same day the Under 13s played their first match at the Brewery Field Bridgend as a curtain raiser to a Celtic Crusaders in the Super League.

Summer season 2009 An Under 17 side was added in this season but was not successful and did not complete the season. An adult side played 2 friendly matches as a taster before entry for the league in the following season.

Summer season 2010 The senior side debuted in the League against Neath Port Talbot Steelers and won the game. Under 13s first of the clubs sides to reach a play off series.

Summer season 2011 Under 14s added for this season. Under 15s made the Wales Rugby League play off final losing to Pontyclun Panthers

== See also ==
- Rugby League in Wales
- Wales Rugby League
- List of rugby league clubs in Britain
