= Cambridge Eagles =

English amateur rugby league club

- Eagle

Club information
- Full name: Cambridge Eagles RLFC
- Colours: White, gold and black
- Founded: 1990; 35 years ago
- Exited: 2010; 15 years ago
- Website: www.cambridgeeagles.co.uk

Former details
- Ground(s): Sawston RUFC
- Competition: Rugby League Conference Eastern Division

Cambridge Eagles Rugby League Club was a rugby league team representing the city of Cambridge, England. The club competed in the East Division of the Rugby League Conference.

The team train and played home games at Sawston Rugby Club which is located at Sawston Village College.

The vast majority of the players, came from surrounding rugby union clubs, wishing to maintain fitness and enhance skill levels over the summer off-season.

== History ==
Cambridge City Tigers were formed in 1987 and played their first game against Peterborough on 21 February 1988 which was won 34-28. The club applied to the London League and played the 88/89 season in Division 2, winning 2 games all season and finishing bottom but the increasing interest and standards meant that in the 89/90 season Tigers won the second division and promotion to the first. After the 1990/91 season the Chairman of Cambridge City Tigers decide to break away and form his own club - Cambridge Eagles, the players who were not invited to play for the new club, formed Cambridge Tigers. The new Cambridge Eagles team, based around forces players, continued to play in the London League.

Cambridge Eagles missed out at the first stage of applications to the new Southern Conference in 1997. However, Reading Raiders announced that they would remain in the London League. Thus Cambridge were offered their place. Cambridge joined the Eastern Division where they have played ever since.

The club's previous home was at Cantabs Rugby Union ground on Long Road in Cambridge. It was decided in 2008 to move the team permanently to Sawston.

After a bumpy and difficult start to the season Cambridge Eagles folded. With immediate effect the Eagles were withdrawn from the RLC East and are barred from joining again in the 2010 season.
