= Kent Ravens =

Defunct English rugby league club

Club information
- Full name: Kent Ravens Rugby League Football
- Founded: 2004; 21 years ago
- Exited: 2009; 16 years ago

Former details
- Ground(s): Princes Park
- Competition: Rugby League Conference

The Kent Ravens are a defunct amateur rugby league club from Eltham in south-east London, founded in 2004 by Alan Bacon. They played at Princes Park.

The club won 10 titles in the two seasons since its creation on 12 June 2004, including the women's London league runners up, the under-11s overall London championship and the men's London League Plate grand final.

== The Early History of Rugby League in Kent ==
The first rugby league club in Kent was a professional outfit, called Kent Invicta. Invicta were formed by Paul Faires and were admitted to the Rugby League on 6 April 1983. Southend United Football Club then approached Invicta and in late 1984 became Southend Invicta but they were struck from the 1985–86 fixtures by the Rugby League only days before the commencement of the new season because they were considered not to have formed a team. They went into liquidation soon afterwards.

There have been many other small amateur teams that played rugby league in Kent, such as Bexleyheath RLFC who won the London League Second division in 1987/1988 and Ashford Bears (1991–1993) who were made up of construction workers from the North of England.

== Kent Ravens ==
On Saturday 12 June 2004 Kent Ravens juniors beat Brixton Bulls in a friendly at South London Storm's ground in Croydon. Two weeks later came the start of the Kent Ravens men's team when they entered the London League and played a strong Bedford Tigers side.

But for the Eltham-based club any thoughts of the 2004 season were miles away when the 2005 season started with new ambitions and four new teams within the club including the first ever Kent based women's rugby league team.

The 2005 season was dedicated to the memory of Adam Donnelly. The under-9s, won one festival, women's team were runners up in the London League, the under-13s won the plate at the Mitcham festival and the under-11s won six titles including the overall London Broncos 'Half time Heroes' title for 2004. The men's team won their first piece of silverware when they beat Feltham Eagles 30–18 in the London League plate final and the under-15s had some good results including a 108–6 win over Mitcham Bulls.

The club also tried to take some drastic and unusual steps to help lay some long term roots in Kent which included staying in the London League for a second season and also trying to bridge the gap with rugby union which is more popular than rugby league in Kent; the season saw the men enter the Footscray 7s tournament and end the season by beating their hosts, Brockleians RFC, in a cross- code challenge match 28–10.

The 2006 season saw Kent Ravens men move up to the Rugby League Conference with local rivals Broadstairs Bulldogs (who won the regionals). The Ravens cemented their position in a new league by finishing fourth and entering the season ending play-offs only to be put out at the semi-final stage by Greenwich Admirals. The same could be said for the women's section as they finished third and did not make the final. The Junior Ravens closed off the 2006 season with an impressive run for the under-13s who only lost once.

The end of the 2006 season was when the Ravens said farewell to their rented ground at Brockleians RFC in Eltham, London as with the start of 2007 the Ravens played at the 4,100 capacity Princes Park stadium, Dartford.

In 2007, Kent Ravens' first team moved up a league to the South Premier, giving the Ravens what turned out to be a tough season with only one win against Kingston Warriors. But the highlight of the season was the defeat to London Skolars in front of a crowd of 470 and the Sky TV camera in the Princes Park Stadium. Ex Leeds Rhino's star Steve Scanlan scored the only try of the match for the Ravens which was the first ever try to be scored at Princes Park Stadium. More success came to the Junior Ravens as their under-12s went on to finish in the semi-finals of their league and a number were selected to advance onto origin level and represent South of London, while first team player Aiden Oakley also picked up an award as Scotland's under-18 player of the season.

The Ravens started the 2008 season in the South Premier but had their fixtures stopped after one game and rejoined the London League making it to the play-offs and beating Norwich City Saxons. In 2009, the club left Princes Park and moved to New Ash Green. They were back again in the Rugby League Conference in 2009 but failed to complete the season in the London & South division and folded.

== Club honours ==
- London League Plate: 2005
