= Bury Titans =

English amateur rugby league club, based in Bury St Edmunds, Suffolk

- Titan (mythology)

Club information
- Full name: Bury Titans ARLFC
- Colours: Red and black
- Founded: 1998; 28 years ago

Current details
- Competition: Rugby League Conference East Division

Bury Titans are rugby league team based in Bury St Edmunds, Suffolk. They play in the East Division of the Rugby League Conference.

== History ==
South Norfolk Saints joined the Eastern Division of the Rugby League Conference in 1998. In this inaugural season, they won their division and qualified for the grand final where they lost to Crawley Jets.

South Norfolk Saints who took a year off from the Conference in the 2002 season and played in the London League instead. They re-joined the Eastern Division in 2003.

South Norfolk Saints rebranded as Thetford Titans for the 2008 season and Bury Titans in 2009.

== Club honours ==
- RLC Eastern Division: 1998, 2003

== See also ==
- Bury St Edmunds RUFC
