= Durham Tigers =

English amateur rugby league club

Club information
- Full name: Durham Tigers Rugby Football League Club
- Colours: Black & Yellow
- Founded: 1990; 36 years ago
- Website: http://www.pitchero.com/clubs/durhamtigersopenage

Current details
- Ground: Sunnydale Leisure Centre, Shildon
- Competition: North East Junior League North East Area Div 2

Durham Tigers are a rugby league club based in Sunnydale Leisure Centre, Shildon, County Durham in the North East of England. They originally played in the city of Durham. The city of Durham is now represented in the Rugby League Conference by Durham Demons.

The club has a number of teams for males age six to adults, as well as junior school-age girls. The junior teams play in the North East Junior League.

The club's most famous old boy Patrick Rich went on to play professionally for Keighley Cougars, Oldham R.L.F.C., London Skolars and Sheffield Eagles.

== History ==
Durham Tigers date back to the early 1990s when rugby league began to be played in the North East of England. The team was formed by Steve Rich and was based at the cricket club in Langley Moor in the city of Durham.

When adult rugby league moved to a summer season, the Tigers, located at a cricket ground, could not play in the summer. Without the backing of adult rugby the junior section failed to flourish. The game in the area was revived when Lisa Jaggar, Rugby League North East regional development officer, asked Gareth Barron and Phil Selby to form a senior side to go into the Rugby League Conference North East division to fill a gap created when Gateshead Panthers merged into Newcastle Knights before the 2001 season.

The newly renamed Durham Phoenix struggled but were eventually rescued when players from Gateshead Storm helped out Durham. After this initial season the club returned to their former name of Durham Tigers.

The club moved to Bishop Auckland RFC's West Mills ground. With an influx of players from Bishop Auckland RFC and Consett RFC as well as Yorkshire-based players the team flourished. Durham Tigers won the North East division in 2005 and went into the national play-offs only to lose to Wetherby Bulldogs.

Junior development then became the issue, having become one of the top junior sides in the North East, the under-16s joined the Yorkshire Youth league.

In 2007 Durham stepped up and joined the North Premier Division. Coach John Coutts joined Gateshead Storm and a couple of leading players went with him. Yorkshire-based players stopped playing for Durham when a Yorkshire Premier division was formed. Results were poor and the team folded after a big defeat by Jarrow Vikings. Following on from this the club committee decided to concentrate on junior development.

Durham planned to upgrade facilities at Bishop Auckland in partnership with Bishop Auckland RFC having acquired Sports England Club Mark status. However, the club's lease was revoked and Durham Tigers initially re-located to St. John's School. However, in March 2010 the club moved into the Sunnydale Leisure Centre in Shildon with the intention of making this their long term home.

In 2015 Durham Tigers is the only Community based Rugby League Club based in South Durham with their home still at Shildon. The club continues to seek new players and develop them, encouraging players to play both codes of rugby at junior level to maximise their development. In 2015 the club was accredited as an England Player development Club by the RFL and several coaches were accredited as England Player Development Coaches after completing the successful Embed the Pathway programme.

The year culminated with Jake Egglestone (developed through the junior teams at Tigers) becoming a regular for the Newcastle Thunder Under 19's and Nathaniel Kitching being selected as the captain of the Newcastle Thunder Academy under 16's team.

== Club honours ==
- RLC North East Division: 2005
- Yorkshire league cup semi-finalists: 2008
- Under-12 league and play-off winners: 2008/09
- 2014 – North East RFL Under 12's League Winners
- 2014 – North East RFL Under 12's play-off runners up
- 2015 – North East RFL Under 13's Play off Champions
- 2015 – North East RFL Under 13's Challenge Cup Winners
