= Portsmouth Navy Seahawks =

Defunct English amateur rugby league club

Club information
- Founded: 2003; 23 years ago
- Website: http://portsmouthnavyseahawks.co.uk/

Current details
- Competition: Rugby League Conference South Premier

Portsmouth Navy Seahawks were a rugby league team based in Gosport, Hampshire. They played in the South Premier Division of the Rugby League Conference. The Seahawks, as a club, is open to non-service players as well as members of the Royal Navy. The club is now renamed United Services Portsmouth Seahawks Rugby League Club.

== History ==
Gosport & Fareham Vikings joined the London & South Division of the Rugby League Conference in 2003. The club made a mid-season withdrawal in 2005 and didn't return to the Conference until 2007, this time to the South Division.

Gosport & Fareham Vikings became Portsmouth Navy Seahawks for the 2008 season and took part in the Rugby League Conference South Premier Division finishing fifth.

== Club honours ==
- London & South East League: 2012, 2013, 2015
- West of England: 2016
