= East Lancashire Lions =

English amateur rugby league club

Club information
- Full name: East Lancashire Lions RLFC
- Founded: 2003; 23 years ago
- Website: www.eastlancslions.com

Current details
- Ground: Anchor Ground
- Competition: Rugby League Conference National Division

East Lancashire Lions is a rugby league club from Darwen in Lancashire. They currently play in the Rugby League Conference National Division. The Lions play their home games at the Anchor Ground, home of Darwen FC.

== History ==
A side known as East Lancashire joined the North West Counties League division 5 for the 1981-2 season. East Lancashire finished bottom and resigned from the league. They failed to fulfil 16 of their fixtures and lost the other 14. They are not connected to the side known as East Lancashire Lions.

Bolton Le Moors were formed in 2003 as with the intention of trying to develop rugby league in Bolton. Their home ground in their early years was Bolton rugby union club. They joined the North West Division of the Rugby League Conference in 2003; they won the RLC Shield in this inaugural year beating Torfaen Tigers in the final at Wilderspool, Warrington. They joined the Central Premier Division in 2005.

Bolton Le Moors moved to Darwen to become East Lancashire Lions. They joined the North Premier Division. In 2006 they played through their first season, won the North Premier beating Cottingham Phoenix in the Grand final and managed to get into the Harry Jepson Trophy Grand Final but eventually lost to South London Storm 30-0 at Ivor Preece Field, Binley Woods near Coventry, the home of Broadstreet RUFC.

In 2007, East Lancashire Lions joined the National Division winning 4 out of 16 matches, coming eighth in the league. They finished a distant last in 2008 after winning just two of their 18 matches.

East Lancashire Lions took a season’s sabbatical from the National Division in 2010 to secure a new home base but never returned to the league.

== Club honours ==
- RLC Shield: 2003
- RLC North Premier: 2006

== See also ==
- Rugby League Conference
