= Hainault Bulldogs =

English rugby league club, based in Dagenham, Greater London

Club information
- Founded: 2007; 18 years ago
- Exited: 2011; 14 years ago
- Website: www.hainaultbulldogs.com

Former details
- Ground(s): Dagenham Rugby Club, Central Pavilion Central Park
- Competition: Rugby League Conference South Premier

Hainault Bulldogs were a rugby league team based in Dagenham, Greater London. They played in the South Premier Division of the Rugby League Conference.

== History ==
Hainault Bulldogs were formed in 2007 by former Leeds and London Broncos player Kevin Reith. The 2007 season saw the Bulldogs beat all-comers within the London League and narrowly lose to a Metropolitan Police side in a friendly. The Bulldogs beat St Albans Centurions 'A' side in the semi-finals and then beat Eastern Raiders 30–4 in the final.

2008 saw the Bulldogs form two teams, with the first team in the Rugby League Conference and a development team in the London League. The first team finished the season champions of the RLC Eastern Division and reached the semi-finals of the national play-offs.

2009 saw the Bulldogs compete in the RLC Premier and after a disastrous start managed to win 4 of their last 5 games to finish 8th out of 10. Hainault Bulldogs 'A' failed to complete the 2009 season in the Eastern Division but will be competing in the London League in 2010.

Hainault Bulldogs failed to complete the 2011 season in the South Premier division and had their fixtures taken over by London Skolars A. The club was dissolved later that year.

== Juniors ==
Hainault's juniors take part in the London Junior League.

Honours :

Under 16s London League North

Under 14s London League North

== Club honours ==
- London League: 2007
- RLC Eastern Division: 2008
- RLC Best New Club 2008
- U16s London League North 2009
- U12s London League North 2009
