= Lymm RL =

English amateur rugby league club

- Wolf

Club information
- Colours: Black, red and white
- Founded: June 1998; 28 years ago
- Website: www.pitchero.com/clubs/lymmrl

Current details
- Ground: Crouchley Lane, Lymm, Cheshire
- Competition: North West Merit League

Lymm RL is a rugby league side based in Lymm, Cheshire. They play in the North West Merit League.

== History ==
Crewe Wolves entered the Northern Division of the Rugby League Conference in 1999 playing their first season at Georges Playing Fields, in their first season, Crewe Wolves Man of Steel was Chris mcgarrigle, who played In the London league for Stretham Celtic, Leicester RLFC and Stoke RLFC.

In seasons 2000-2002 they played at Sandbach RUFC and 2003–2004 at Winnington Park RFC. Crewe & Nantwich Steamers started in early 2003 as a junior colts team with some senior players and then joined forces with Wolves to create one senior and one colts team under one club.

The Wolves played at Crosfields ARLFC in Warrington in 2005 before returning to Crewe for the 2006 season. In 2007, Crewe & Nantwich Steamers broke with Wolves and formed their own senior and colts sides.

In 2008, Crewe Wolves moved their home once more, this time to Lymm RUFC. This move incorporated a name change to Lymm Wolves.

In 2009, the club dropped the Wolves name to become Lymm RL. After competing in the Cheshire Division in 2008, the club moved up to the Rugby League Conference North West Premier. Lymm RL finished top of the table and defeated Widnes Saints 20–10 in the final to be crowned the North West Premier Champions 2009. Lymm knocked out Kippax Knights with a 28–26 victory in the national quarter-finals before being pipped for a national Grand Final appearance with a 32–20 defeat against Coventry Bears. They were coached by Paul Flannery and Anthony Sullivan. In 2011, Lymm were dropped from the North West Premier to North West Merit League due allegedly to a late application. They played several players from Lymm Rugby union club. This included first team stalwarts Adam Fletcher and Ollie Higginson.

== Club honours ==
- RLC North West Premier: 2009
