= Eastern Rhinos =

English amateur rugby league club

Club information
- Full name: Eastern Rhinos Rugby League Club
- Colours: Blue and White
- Founded: 1992; 34 years ago as Felixstowe
- Website: www.easternrhinos.co.uk

Current details
- Ground: Mill Road playing fields, Colchester, CO4 5JF
- Captain: Chris Kerkow
- Competition: Southern Conference League

The Eastern Rhinos Rugby League Football Club is a British rugby league club based in Colchester, in the county of Essex. Their first team plays in the Southern Conference League and the Eastern Rhinos A-side play in the East Rugby League and Rhinos run a youth section with teams for boys aged 6 through to U18s.

== Club history ==
The club was formed in 1992 from the successful Civil Service South East Team and began life on the Suffolk coast as Felixstowe Eastern Rugby League Football Club.

Due to the wide catchment area of players' homes the club moved to the county town of Ipswich in time for the 1995 - 1996 season and were elected to the London Amateur Rugby League.

The club based itself at Ipswich RUFC in 1995, a club of 125 years standing where Felixstowe Eastern became Ipswich Rhinos in honour of the South African national side the Rhinos. The summer of 1997 saw the birth of the Southern Conference League, which the Rhinos also competed in, and committed themselves to. With no formal winter games to play the club took on friendly fixtures during these months.

In 1998 the SCL became the Rugby League Conference. Ipswich Rhinos finished fifth out of a total of 15 teams. The club won the Eastern Division title in 2001.

The club continues to play in the RLC and in 2005 advanced to the new South Premier division, fielding a second team in the London League. They also launched a feeder club, Colchester Romans, who also played in the London League. In their first competitive season the Romans reached the Grand Final and successfully applied to join the Rugby League Conference in their own right.

In 2006 Colchester entered the RLC in their own right and the two clubs joined their second teams together to form the London League team Eastern Raiders. In 2007 the Rhinos finished fourth in the South Premier in what was a strong and competitive division.

The club became Eastern Rhinos for the 2010 season to consolidate all their teams under one banner and based themselves permanently at Colchester.

In 2019, the club joined the Eastern Division of the newly-formed Southern Conference League.

== Club honours ==
- RLC Eastern Division: 1999, 2001, 2004
- National Conference South Plate Winners: 2026
