= Elmbridge Eagles =

English amateur rugby league club

Club information
- Full name: Elmbridge Eagles RL
- Founded: 1985; 41 years ago

Current details
- Competition: Rugby League Conference South Premier

Elmbridge Eagles RL are a rugby league club from Elmbridge in Surrey. They were one of the founding members of the Rugby League Conference as Kingston.

== History ==
In 1978, schoolboys at Ambleside Middle School in Walton-on-Thames, Surrey were introduced to the game by a teacher. The boys really took to it and began to play matches against other schools in 1979. An early claim to fame came in September 1980 when the boys were invited to take part in a curtain raiser at Craven Cottage when Fulham RLFC took on Wigan in their first ever fixture. They also became the first school team from the South of England to win a game in Yorkshire. Graham Belbin, long serving coach at Elmbridge was involved in that first curtain raiser game for Ambleside.

However, when the boys transferred to the local senior school, the PE teacher there wouldn't allow them to play. Undeterred, they carried on, surreptitiously using the school's facilities until they were found out. When they reached the age of 16 they became an Open Age club under the name Ambleside.

Then someone from Wokingham in Berkshire found a council ground, so the club relocated and changed their name to Wokingham. Players trained at Bracknell Leisure Centre but a lot of the players still came from the Walton area and travelling to Berkshire to train and play was too far. The club found a pitch at Lightwater Country Park, which they shared with Lightwater RFC for around seven seasons. The club were nicknamed the squirrels with the club logo being modelled on the squirrel badge of the country park.

So by 1986, the club had changed its name again to Surrey Heath and were playing in the Southern Amateur Rugby League. For the 1986/87 season, they joined the Midlands and South West Amateur Rugby League Association (MASWARLA) in its second season but returned to the Southern Amateur Rugby League, which had been rebranded the London League, for the 1988–89 season.

The local council decided to re-lay the pitch at Lightwater, which left the club looking for another home. They played at Esher RFC for about three years. They then moved to nearby Claygate as tenants of a rugby union club, Old Johnians, they would subsequently take over the ground as Old Johnians moved on merging with another club. This move prompted another name change to Kingston in 1996 and were one of the founding members of the Southern Conference in 1997. They were placed in the Eastern Division but resigned from the conference after only playing one game. They remained in the London League until the final winter season of 1999/2000 but had their results expunged from the table for calling off too many games.

Newly rebranded Kingston Warriors returned to the Southern Conference, now known as the Rugby League Conference, in 2000 and competed in the Southern Division. The club played at the same level for the next few years with its division being known as the London & South Division between 2001 and 2003; the South Division in 2004 and the London & South Division in 2005.

Kingston Warriors won the London & South Division and made it as far as the semi-final of the Harry Jepson Trophy but lost 36–16 to Gloucestershire Warriors. In that very same season Kingston Warriors legendary wing/full back Damian Lawton scored 17 tries in 15 games which still stands as a record today. Warriors were promoted to the Rugby League Conference South Premier division in 2006. The move to Claygate became permanent; the club now had a home of their own and became Elmbridge in 2006, because the ground was owned by the local council and didn't want them playing under the name associated with the neighbouring Kingston borough. The club added "Eagles" in 2009.

Elmbridge Rugby League Club later moved to their current ground in Claygate (currently going through refurbishment) under the name of Kingston Warriors. Eventually the identity was changed to Elmbridge Rugby League, Elmbridge being the Borough council district that the ground is situated within. The club is a founding member of the Southern Conference and has teams from Under 7 to Adults. During the ground refurbishment period Elmbridge Rugby Club are now based at nearby Old Cranleighans Sports Club in Thames Ditton.

The Elmbridge Club has an experienced coaching team that all have strong links to the region and all of whom are coaches for the Broncos Regional Origins Representative programme, providing a pathway to the Broncos Scholarship and Academy Squads. Alongside Graham Belbin, Kevin Rudd, the former head of the Rugby League European Federation is now a volunteer at the club and was coached by John Risman, during their time with Scotland Rugby League. John played for Fulham in that opening game in 1980 and is listed as Player No.1 on the London Broncos Heritage Players List.

Brother of Sir Bev Risman, whom was also influential with Rugby League in London in the 1980s/90's, establishing many foundations for the sport. A statue to their father Gus Risman can be found outside Wembley Stadium. Matt Walker also played at London Skolars, before moving to the Elmbridge region and going into coaching at the club.

Elmbridge welcome contact from players and volunteers alike interested to get involved in Rugby League at one of the oldest Community Clubs in London.

== Club history ==
- RLC London & South Division: 2005, 2011
- RLC Regional: 2011

== See also ==
- Rugby League Conference
