= Carluke Tigers =

Scottish amateur rugby league club

Club information
- Full name: Carluke Tigers; Rugby League Football Club
- Founded: 2008; 18 years ago

Current details
- Ground: Hamilton Palace, Hamilton
- Coach: (Scotland) Morgan Martin
- Captain: (Scotland) Morgan Martin
- Competition: Rugby League Conference Scotland Division
- 2008: League – 2nd Overall – 3rd

Uniforms
Home colours	Away colours

Carluke Tigers are an amateur rugby league team. They play in the Scotland Division of the Rugby League Conference. The team is the only premier rugby league side in Lanarkshire. The club plays their home games at Hamilton Palace, Hamilton, while training takes place at The Moor Park in Carluke.

== 2009 season ==
League

Date	Home			Away
16 May	Edinburgh Eagles	60	4	Carluke Tigers
23 May	Carluke Tigers	94	24	Hillfoot Rams
30 May	Jordanhill Phoenix	24	38	Carluke Tigers
6 June	Carluke Tigers	82	12	Moray Eels
20 June	Fife Lions	66	0	Carluke Tigers
27 June	Carluke Tigers	68	8	Easterhouse Panthers
4 July	Victoria Knights	0	24	Carluke Tigers

== 2008 season ==
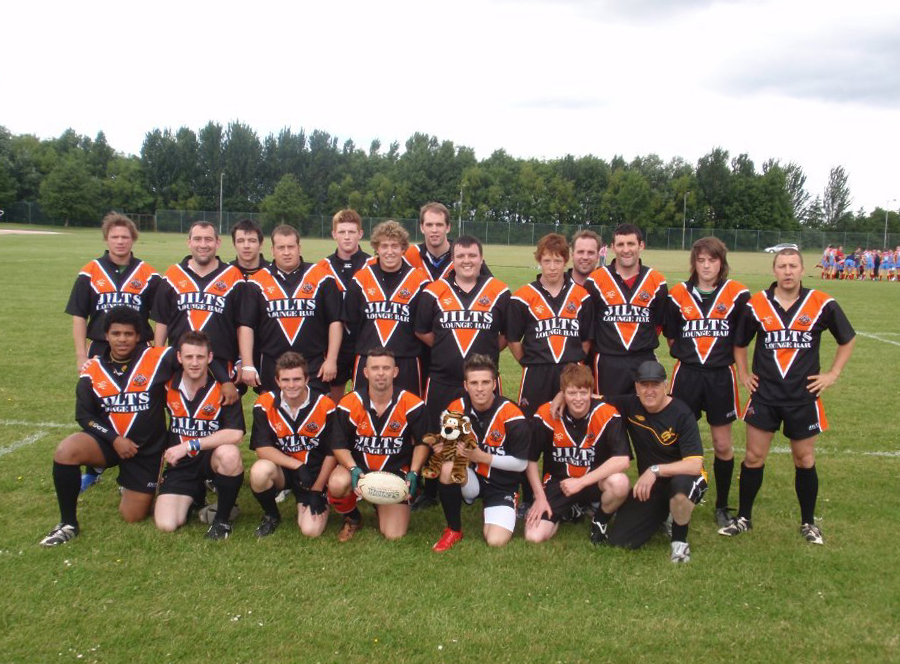
The Carluke Tigers Squad 2008

The 2008 season was the clubs first and they have managed to finish second in the Scottish Rugby League Conference, partly due to outstanding performances by Craig "Chubbs" Lewis, who holds the record number of tries in a rugby league season (17) due to his breathtaking sidestep and deceptive speed. Another player to mention is their Zimbabwean born prop Nico Nyemba, who along with Nick "Vinny" McAuley and player/coach Morgan Martin battered holes in every defence. This qualified them for the play-offs. However, they suffered defeats in both games which meant they would play in the Shield Final against Paisley Hurricanes.

League

Date	Home			Away
17 May	Carluke Tigers	22	28	Edinburgh Eagles
24 May	Jordanhill Phoenix	10	64	Carluke Tigers
31 May	Carluke Tigers	50	22	Paisley Hurricanes
7 June	Moray Eels	4	74	Carluke Tigers
14 June	Carluke Tigers	16	54	Fife Lions
28 June	Easterhouse Panthers	22	34	Carluke Tigers

Final League Table

	P	W	D	L	F	A	Pts
Edinburgh Eagles	6	6	0	0	304	50	12
Carluke Tigers	6	4	0	2	260	140	8
Fife Lions	6	4	0	2	214	114	8
Paisley Hurricanes	6	3	0	3	180	212	6
Moray Eels	6	3	0	3	145	202	6
Easterhouse Panthers	6	1	0	5	120	211	2
Jordanhill Phoenix	6	0	0	6	90	384	0

RLC Playoffs

12 July 2008 - Edinburgh Eagles 42–18 Carluke Tigers

19 July 2008 - Carluke Tigers 20–28 Fife Lions

SRL Shield Final

2 August 2008 - Carluke Tigers 24–0 Paisley Hurricanes (Walkover)

== Club honours ==
- RLC Scottish Shield: 2008
- RLC Scottish Division: 2010

== See also ==
- Rugby league in Scotland
- List of rugby league clubs in Britain
