= Easterhouse Panthers =

Scottish amateur rugby league club

Club information
- Full name: Easterhouse Panthers ARFLC
- Nickname(s): The Panthers
- Founded: 2005; 20 years ago
- Website: www.easterhousepanthers.co.uk

Current details
- Ground(s): Barrachnie Park, Glasgow East RFC
- CEO: Susan Senter
- Chairman: Mark Senter
- Coach: Chad McGlame
- Competition: Scottish National League.

Uniforms
Home colours	Away colours

Easterhouse Panthers are a Scottish rugby league team based in Easterhouse in the East End of Glasgow. They played in the Scottish National League. They currently play at Barrachnie Park in Glasgow. Some of their former players and coaching staff came together after they became defunct to form Glasgow Rugby League late in 2018.

== History ==
Easterhouse Panthers began as a group of youth teams for children in the East End of Glasgow under the name Easterhouse Panthers Cubs. A senior side was set up in 2005 by Mark Senter who went on to be both head coach and chairman, and joined the Scottish National League, finishing bottom with just one win. Progress was made the following two seasons as they won three games in each campaign. More seasons of struggle continued until 2013 when they finished top of the Central Conference losing just one game and after beating Edinburgh Eagles and Moray Titans in the play-offs they met Northern Conference winners Aberdeen Warriors in the final at Falkirk RFC. In the final they were beaten by a late score to lose 28-30. The U17s won the Scottish title in 2011, 2012, and 2013 and the U15s lifted the crown in 2012. In March 2014 fellow Glasgow club Victoria Knights, who were based in the south of Glasgow, moved under the banner of Easterhouse to create a bigger club base. In January 2015 the club undertook a major re-shuffle following on from this and a new coaching set up was implemented with former players Chad McGlame and Louis Senter being appointed coach and assistant. In 2011, two of their former players signed professional contracts with Super League clubs Hull F.C. and Hull Kingston Rovers, those being Chad McGlame and David Scott. Scott would later move on to Batley Bulldogs where he was capped by Scotland and was voted Scotland's Player of the Year in 2015, and in 2013 Louis Senter signed for Halifax. The club also runs a wheelchair rugby league team called the Glasgow Panthers.

== Grounds ==
During their existence the club has played at a few grounds including Renfrew RFC, Nethercraigs Sports Complex in Corkerhill, Whitecraigs RFC and Hamilton RFC.

== Internationals ==
In 2014 both Louis Senter and Gregor Ramsay' were called into the Scotland squad for the 2014 European Cup and in 2015 Senter was named again for the 2015 European Cup.

- Louis Senter - 2 apps 2014 v Wales, v Ireland

During the 2014 Commonwealth Games in Glasgow a Rugby League U19S 9s tournament was held and two players were picked for the Scotland squad Jack Feeney and Keiran Wyber.

== Honours ==
- Central Conference League (1): 2013

== See also ==
- Rugby league in Scotland
- List of rugby league clubs in Britain
