= Rugby Football League =

Governing body for professional rugby league football in England

- Founded: 29 August 1895; 131 years ago
- Formerly named: Northern Rugby Football Union (1895–1922)
- IRL affiliation: 1948
- ERL affiliation: 2003
- Responsibility: England (United Kingdom) Great Britain (Note: The Rugby Football League (RFL) is the governing body of rugby league in England. Prior to the creation of Scotland Rugby League and Wales Rugby League in 1994 and 1995 respectively, the RFL governed all Great Britain. Due to the continued use of a whole British rugby league system, the RFL retains certain controls in Scotland and Wales.)
- Headquarters: Sportcity, Manchester
- Key people: The Princess of Wales (Patron); Adam Hills (President); Ian Nolan (Chief Executive)
- Competitions: Professional Leagues; Super League; Championship; Community Leagues; National Conference League; Conference League South; Cups; Challenge Cup; 1895 Cup; International Cups; World Club Challenge
- Website: rugby-league.com

(England)
- As of 21 April 2026

The Rugby Football League (RFL) is the governing body for rugby league in England. Founded in 1895 as the Northern Rugby Football Union following 22 clubs resigning from the Rugby Football Union, it changed its name in 1922 to the Rugby Football League.

Based at Sportcity in Manchester, it is responsible for organising professional competitions and, in association with the British Amateur Rugby League Association (BARLA), the community game. It also provides match officials for every level as well as administering the England national team.

The Rugby Football League has been a member of the International Rugby League (IRL) since 1948 and European Rugby League (ERL) since its foundation in 2003.

== History ==
=== Formation ===
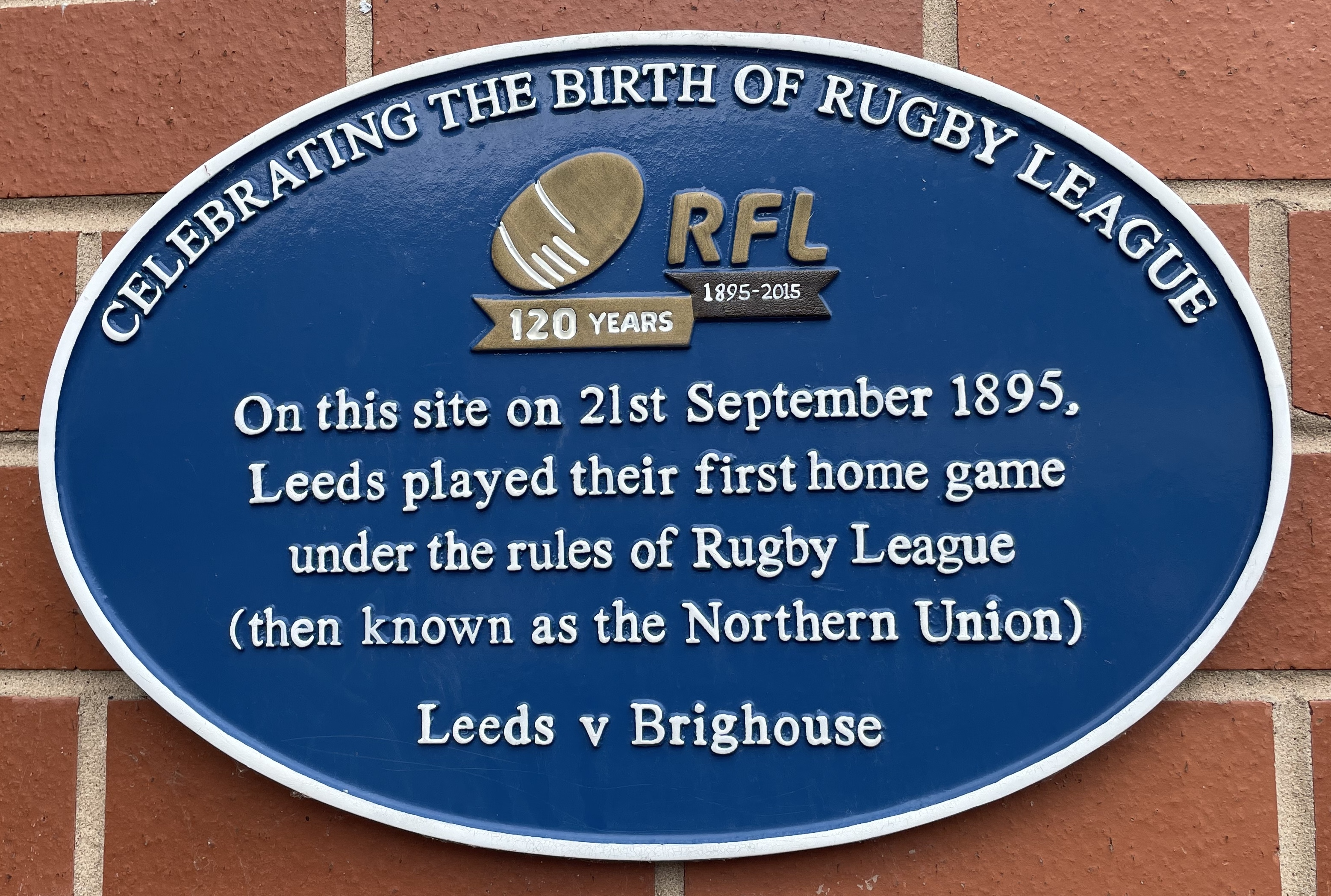
Plaque celebrating the birth of Rugby League

On Tuesday 27 August 1895, as a result of an emergency meeting in Manchester, prominent Lancashire rugby clubs Broughton Rangers, Leigh, Oldham, Rochdale Hornets, St Helens, Tyldesley, Warrington, Widnes and Wigan declared that they would support their Yorkshire colleagues in their proposal to form a Northern Union.

Two days later, on Thursday 29 August 1895, representatives of 21 clubs met in the George Hotel, Huddersfield to form the "Northern Rugby Football Union" (usually termed Northern Union or NU). Twenty clubs agreed to resign from the Rugby Football Union, but Dewsbury felt unable to comply with the decision. The Cheshire club, Stockport, had telegraphed the meeting requesting admission to the new organisation and was duly accepted with a second Cheshire club, Runcorn, admitted at the next meeting.

The 22 clubs were:

1. Batley
2. Bradford FC (switched to association football in 1907 and became Bradford Park Avenue)
3. Brighouse Rangers (Folded in 1906, now survives as an amateur club)
4. Broughton Rangers (Folded in 1955)
5. Halifax
6. Huddersfield
7. Hull FC
8. Hunslet (Folded in 1973 but were resurrected as a Phoenix club)
9. Leeds
10. Leigh
11. Liversedge (Folded in 1902, survive as an amateur club)
12. Manningham (Switched to association football in 1903 and became Bradford City)
13. Oldham
14. Rochdale Hornets
15. Runcorn (Folded in 1918)
16. St Helens
17. Stockport (Folded in 1902)
18. Tyldesley (Folded in 1902)
19. Wakefield Trinity
20. Warrington
21. Widnes
22. Wigan

=== Subsequent events ===
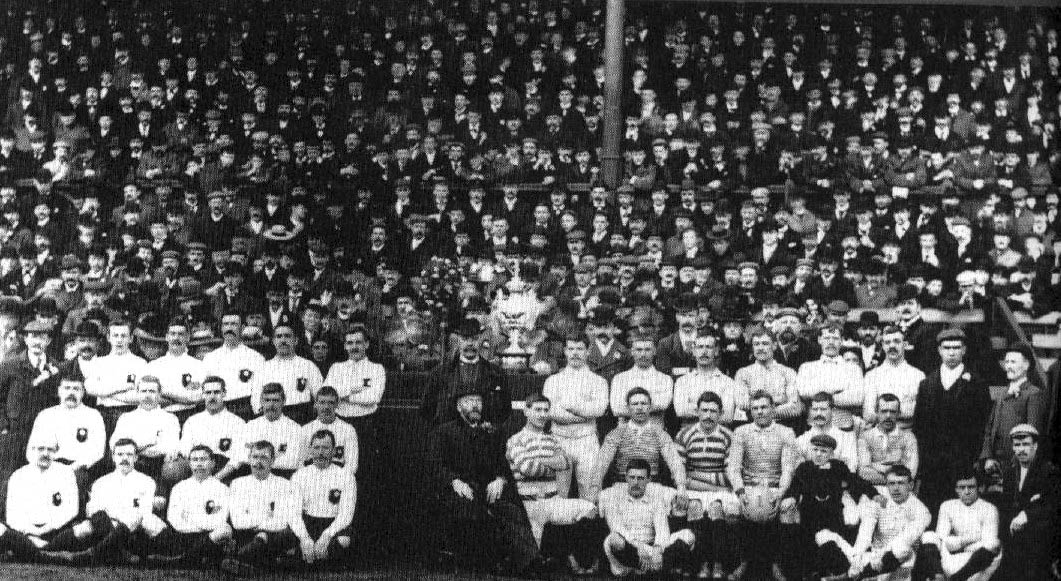
The first Challenge Cup Final in 1897 was won by Batley against St Helens

Upon its founding, the Northern Union created in league competition with the first season being the 1895–96 season. The Challenge Cup came two years later in 1896–97.

1904 saw the creation of the England national rugby league team who played the Other Nationalities rugby league team in rugby league's first international matches.

In 1906, the Northern Union reduced the sport from 15-a-side to 13-a-side.

In 1907, the Northern Union's brand of rugby was introduced to New Zealand and saw the first ever rugby league tours of New Zealand to Great Britain. For this tour the Wales national rugby league team was formed with the match between Wales and New Zealand being the first recognised international test match by the International Rugby League. On this tour New Zealand played England, and the newly formed Great Britain national rugby league team combining the best players of England and Wales. The Northern Union would go on to favour the use of a Great Britain side over separate England and Wales sides. A year later, the sport was introduced to Australia and saw a similar tour carried out the Australians.

In 1922, Northern Rugby Union became known as "Rugby League".

In 1929, the Challenge Cup final moved to the national stadium.

In 1933, an Ashes match was held in France. The following year, with the help of the RFL, the French Rugby League Federation was formed and rugby league reached its fourth country.

In 1954, the first Rugby League World Cup was held in France and was won by Great Britain.

In 1971, the RFL introduced the 6 tackle rule.

The British Amateur Rugby League Association (BARLA) was created in 1973 in Huddersfield by a group of enthusiasts concerned about the dramatic disappearance of many amateur leagues and clubs. Fewer than 150 amateur teams remained with a mere 30 youth rugby league teams. The 'breakaway' from the RFL was acrimonious and was strongly contested, with a vote 29–1 against recognising BARLA. Thanks to Tom Mitchell, this changed to a unanimous vote of approval for BARLA within 12 months.

In 1976, the RFL created the World Club Challenge, seeing the British champions play the champions of Australia, the only other major rugby league.

1991 saw the introduced of a formalised youth leagues.

Maurice Lindsay became the Chief Executive of the RFL in 1992, proposing the Super League, which replaced Championship as the sport's premier league competition from 1996 onwards. Lindsay returned to Wigan in 1999 for his second stint at the club after Sir Rodney Walker, then chairman of the RFL, sacked him from the RFL after a campaign to unseat him failed.

In 1995, the RFL appointed its first Development Officer for Ireland with the aim of assisting Rugby League Ireland in the sports development across the Irish Sea. 1995 also saw the Great Britain side reserved to tours with England and Wales competing separately in the World Cup.

1996 saw the switch to summer rugby and the creation of the Super League. The competition aimed to be a European competition outside of the British rugby league system, however this never materialised. Despite this, Paris Saint-Germain F.C. formed a rugby league team who competed in the first two seasons, marking the first foreign team to complete in the British game.

The RFL accumulated losses of £1.9 million at the end of 2001, shortly before a major restructuring of the governing body and the appointment of Richard Lewis as executive chairman in May 2002. Within a year of joining the RFL, he oversaw reunification with BARLA after nearly 30 years of division. Lewis left in 2012 to become Chief Executive of the All England Lawn Tennis and Croquet Club. The RFL net value has been positive every year since 2004, being £1.7 million in 2011.

In 2002, London Skolars became the first amateur club to join the professional system, being the first club to do so in 80 years, and marked the start of a period where a number of clubs moved up, each with various levels of success and failure.

In 2006, Catalans Dragons joined the British game, marking the second French team to do so. Unlike PSG, Catalans would go on to be a success in the British game.

In 2011 a major change to the game was agreed, changing from a winter to a summer game, starting in 2012 with a playing season from March to November, aligning with the Super League, which has played this way since 1996. The regional leagues may include winter competitions in addition.

In 2012, the Rugby Football League were awarded the Stonewall Sport Award in recognition of their work in embracing inclusivity and tackling homophobia. They also became the first UK sporting organisation to make the top 100 employers in the Stonewall Index that measures attitudes towards lesbian, gay and bisexual staff.

Prince Harry, Duke of Sussex served as patron until February 2021. He was replaced by his sister in law The Princess of Wales.

In March 2025, chairman Simon Johnson underwent a high profile sudden departure following a motion passed at a council meeting by Leigh Leopards and Batley Bulldogs. This coincidence with a number of other executives' resignations aimed growing unrest from clubs regarding the governing body's decision making. The Guardian describe the RFL as going "from once crisis to another", with this event marking three leadership changes in eight years. The newspaper stated the lack of effective leadership had led to an increase in club power and threatened any potential investments from the National Rugby League, in addition to risking the reversal of the good work that had been on on-field in recent years. In this time of crisis, multiple whistleblowers made complaints about historical sexism and misogyny within the organisation.

In August 2025, Sport England required the RFL to come up with a "Governance Action Plan" after concerns relating to compliance with England's codes of sports governance.

In an October 2025 meeting between the RFL and the Australian Rugby League Commission, ARLC chief Peter V'landys described the RFLs financial viability as a "train crash". Stating they needed to drastically find ways to increase revenue to support the "strong product" they govern.

== Responsibility ==
The Rugby Football League began in 1895 as a rival governing body for rugby in England (rugby league and rugby union had not yet formally diverged at this time) and operated in Northern England only. By 1907, rugby league had begun in Wales with Welsh clubs being incorporated into the Northern English league and saw a separate short lived Wales only league being run by the RFL. 1909 saw the sport's introduced in Scotland, but did not see the same response as Wales. Despite this, the RFL established itself as the governing body for rugby league in Great Britain.

This was the norm until 1994 and the founding of Scotland Rugby League and Wales Rugby League a year later. These bodies became the official governing body for Scotland and Wales leaving the RFL as the official governing body for rugby league in England only. Despite this, Scotland Rugby League is partnered with the RFL in attempt to aid the sport's development in Scotland, (Note: There was a brief period where the Scottish National League was run by the British Amateur Rugby League Association, but outside of this Scotland Rugby League has had full governance of the game in Scotland.) and Wales Rugby League shares governance with the RFL over the domestic competition but has full control of the national team. The RFL never attempted to govern rugby league in Ireland but does assist the sport's development with Rugby League Ireland who were formed in 1988.

Internationally, the RFL established the England national rugby league team in 1904, and Wales and Great Britain in 1907. English, Welsh, Scottish, and Irish players were selected for Great Britain. National teams of Scotland and Ireland were never established under the RFL. The Wales national team has been run by Wales Rugby League since 1995.

== Competitions ==
The RFL operates a five-tier system and is responsible for running the top three professional divisions as well as the National Conference League and various regional leagues below that. The RFL also runs two cup competitions for professional clubs and is involved with the organisation of the World Club Challenge alongside Australia's National Rugby League.

=== Men's ===
RFL Leagues
Name		Tier	Teams	Est.	Latest winners
Super League	Grand Final	1	12	1996	Hull Kingston Rovers
Super League	League Leaders	1	12	1996	Hull Kingston Rovers
Championship	Grand Final	2	14	2003	Toulouse Olympique
Championship	League Leaders	2	14	2003	York Knights
League 1		3	8	2003	North Wales

RFL Domestic Cups
Name	Established	Latest winners
Challenge Cup	1896	Hull Kingston Rovers
1895 Cup	2015	York Knights

RFL International Cups
Name	Established	Latest winners
World Club Challenge	1976	Hull Kingston Rovers

=== Women's ===
- RFL Women's Super League
- RFL Women's Championship
- Women's Challenge Cup

=== Wheelchair ===
- RFL Wheelchair Super League
- RFL Wheelchair Championship
- Wheelchair Challenge Cup

== National teams ==
=== Men's national team ===
The England national rugby league team represent England in international rugby league football tournaments. The team has been largely absent from major tournaments from most of history, having been represented instead by the Great Britain team, who also represented Wales, Scotland, and Ireland. The team (along with Wales, Scotland, and Ireland) replaced Great Britain at the Rugby League World Cup in 1995 and in all other tours and test matches following the 2007 All Golds tour.

The team was formed in 1904 when they played against the Other Nationalities rugby league team, at the time a mixture of Welsh and Scottish players, in Wigan. The team contested the 1975 Rugby League World Cup as a one off due to Wales wanting to showcase their unusually high level of talent at the time (no Scottish or Irish players made the original Great Britain squad), England finish runners-up in that tournament. Since their regular appearances in the World Cup, they have finished as runners-up in a further two occasions, in 1995 (as hosts) and 2017.

England's only major tournament for most of history prior to 1995, England's only tournament was the Rugby League European Championship, in which they developed rivalries with Wales and France. Since then, England has inherited Great Britain's rivalries, primarily with Australia (to whom they now contest The Ashes instead of Great Britain) as well New Zealand.

Traditionally a predominantly white kit is worn including white shorts and socks. However the shirt usually features some form of red, like red stripes, crosses or chevrons. These colours are similar to other English sporting teams and are the colours used on the national flag. In 2008 a new kit was introduced featuring a red cross on the front and red strips down the sides of the shirt, shorts and socks were white too with red strips. In 2008, the Rugby Football League chose to abandon the traditional English lion on the badge in favour of a much simpler shield and Saint George's Cross design, nevertheless the team will still be known as "The Lions".

As of September 2024 the team is ranked third in the world, behind Australia and New Zealand.

=== Women's national team ===
The England national women's rugby league team represent England international rugby league football tournaments and England made its debut during the 2008 Women's Rugby League World Cup. Stuart Barrow is head coach and Jodie Cunningham is the current captain.

=== Wheelchair national team ===
The England national wheelchair rugby league team represents England in international wheelchair rugby league.

=== Great Britain national team ===
The Great Britain national rugby league team represents Great Britain in rugby league football. Administered by the Rugby Football League (RFL), the team is nicknamed the "Great Britain Lions", or simply "The Lions".

For most of the 20th century the Great Britain team was assembled to go on tours overseas, and to play against foreign touring teams, as well as competing in Rugby League World Cup tournaments. They were one of the strongest teams in rugby league, though usually playing second fiddle to Australia. They won the Rugby League World Cup on three occasions: 1954, 1960 and 1972.

Since 1995 the RFL have sent the home nations as separate teams for World Cup purposes. Great Britain continued to compete as a test playing nation both home and away. They competed against Australia for the Ashes, and New Zealand for the Baskerville Shield, as well the Tri-Nations series with both Australia and New Zealand. Great Britain also played in series and tours against other nations such as France, Papua New Guinea and Fiji.

In 2006, the RFL announced that after the 2007 All Golds Tour the Great Britain team would no longer compete on a regular basis, and that players would be able to represent England, Wales and Scotland at Test level.

It was planned that the Great Britain team will come together in future only for occasional tours, similar to the British and Irish Lions in rugby union. However since then, only one of these tours has occurred, the 2019 Great Britain Lions tour, which saw the England squad bolstered by a single Scotsman compete.

=== England Community Lions ===
The England Community Lions are amateur England sides in both men and women's rugby league, with open-age, masters, PDRL, LDRL, and various age category youth teams.

The women's open age category selects player from the RFL Women's Championship and below, with no player being allowed for than one appearance for the national team.

The men's open age category selects players from tier 4 of the British rugby league system and below.

== Board of directors ==
The RFL board consists of the following:

Member	Position
Nigel Wood	Chairman
Ian Nolan	Chief Executive Officer (from 1 October 2026)
Lord (Jonathan) Caine	Non-executive director
Dermot Power	Non-executive director
Martin Coyd	Non-executive director
Emma Rosewarne	Non-executive director
Sara Symington	Non-executive director
Jo Drapier	Board observer
Ed Mallaburn	Board observer

=== Young People's Advisory Panel ===
The RFL launched the Young People's Advisory Panel in 2010, a group consisting of young people aged 16–25 from across England. The national panel meet at least three times a year at the RFL's headquarters to discuss and debate the following:

- Changes in the structure of youth rugby;
- Communications between young rugby league enthusiasts and the RFL;
- RFL policies which impact on young people.

Two nominated members will also sit on the youth & junior forum, a key device used to advance youth rugby league.

== Presidents ==
Tenure	Name	Club
1988–1989	Les Bettinson	Salford
1989–1990	S. Ackroyd	Halifax
1990–1991	Harry Jepson OBE	Leeds
1991–1992	Maurice Lindsay	Wigan
1992–1993	Colin Hutton	Hull Kingston Rovers
1993–1994	R. Waudby	Hull F.C.
1994–1995	R. Teeman	Bramley
1995–1996	Kath Hetherington	Sheffield Eagles
1997	W.J. Mason	Hunslet
1998–1999	T. Smith	Widnes
1999–2000	W. Garrett	Warrington
2000–2001	Ralph Calvin	Whitehaven
2001–2002	M. White	Swinton
2002–2003	R. Taylor	Rochdale Hornets
2003–2004	T. Fleet	Widnes
2004–2005	Gary Hetherington	Leeds
2005–2006	P. Hindle	Castleford
2006–2007	S. Wagner	Featherstone Rovers
2007–2008	G. Liles	Hunslet
2008–2009	K. Nicholas	Batley
2009–2010	Chris Hamilton	Oldham
2010–2011	Bev Risman OBE	
2011–2012	J. Whaling	
2012–2013	J. Hartley	
2013–2014	David Oxley CBE	
2015–2016	Andrew Farrow	
2016–2018	Air Commodore Dean Andrew OBE	United Kingdom Armed Forces
2018–2019	Andy Burnham	Mayor of Greater Manchester
2019–2020	Tony Adams	Sporting Chance Clinic
2020–2022	Clare Balding	Broadcaster and journalist
2022–2024	Lindsay Hoyle	Speaker of the House of Commons
2024–	Adam Hills	Comedian

== Logo ==
The first logo used by the RFL was an oval shape, representing the ball with XIII and 13 over it and The Rugby Football League around it. The logo was also seen on the sleeve of teams shirts.

RFL logo used until 2017 rebrand

In the late 1990s the logo was changed to a more simplistic design to the old one. It had a rugby ball shape with three small lines, representing 13 players, and two long lines, representing goalposts, arranged on a rugby ball so as to suggest a hand carrying or passing it. The Rugby Football League was abbreviated to RFL.

In 2017 the RFL had its most radical rebrand since the formation of Super League. The new logo was a rectangular background meant to represent The George Hotel in Huddersfield, where rugby league was founded and 1895 the year it was founded. Thirteen stripes inside it represent thirteen players. The oval on top represents the ball and the appreciation RFL has been replaced with Rugby Football League.

== Headquarters ==
The RFLs current headquarters are at Sportcity Eithad Campus in East Manchester. The RFL first moved into permanent headquarters in 1922 at 180 Chapeltown Road, Leeds, where it stayed for 73 years before leaving in 1995 to Red Hall in Leeds, a Grade II listed brick building dating from 1642. The RFL left Red Hall and Leeds in May 2021 with the building becoming a private hospital.

In 2015, some departments including Super League, moved to offices at Quay West in Trafford Wharf, Greater Manchester.

== See also ==
- Rugby league in the British Isles
- Rugby league in England
- Rugby league in Ireland
- Rugby league in Scotland
- Rugby league in Wales
- International Rugby League
- Rugby League European Federation
