= Rugby in Scotland =

Rugby in Scotland may refer to:

- Rugby union in Scotland
- Rugby league in Scotland
