= Colin Wilson (rugby) =

Scotland international rugby league footballer

Personal information
- Full name: Colin Wilson
- Born: 23 May 1969 (age 56)

Playing information

Rugby union
- Position: Wing, centre
Representative
Years	Team	Pld	T	G	FG	P
1995	Glasgow District
1996–97	Edinburgh Rugby

Rugby league
- Position: Prop, Second-row, Loose forward
Club
Years	Team	Pld	T	G	FG	P
≤1998–≥98	Linlithgow Lions
1999–≥99	Hull Kingston Rovers
	Total	0	0	0	0	0
Representative
Years	Team	Pld	T	G	FG	P
1998	Scotland	2
- Source: As of 16 May 2012

Colin Wilson (born 23 May 1969) is a former rugby union and professional rugby league footballer who played in the 1990s and 2000s. He played representative level rugby union (RU) for Glasgow District and Edinburgh Rugby, as a wing or centre, and representative level rugby league (RL) for Scotland, and at club level for the Linlithgow Lions and Hull Kingston Rovers (Reserve team), as a prop, second-row or loose forward.

== International honours ==
Colin Wilson won caps for Scotland (RL) while at Linlithgow Lions 1998 2-caps (sub).

1988 and 1989 Ulster U20 XV trialist, centre. 1995 Glasgow District Union representative XV, wing. 1996 Edinburgh District Union representative XV, wing. 1997 Edinburgh District Union representative XV, wing. 1997 Captain of inaugural Scotland amateur XIII, prop. 1998 Captain of Scotland amateur XIII, prop. 1998 Played for Scotland professional XIII, prop. 1999 Trialist and signed for Hull Kingston Rovers RLFC, prop. 2002 Scotland amateur XIII, loose forward.
