= Aberdeen Warriors =

Defunct Scottish amateur rugby league club, based in Aberdeen

Aberdeen Warriors Rugby League

Club information
- Full name: Aberdeen Warriors Rugby League
- Nickname: Warriors
- Founded: 2010; 16 years ago
- Exited: 2017; 9 years ago

Former details
- Ground: TBC
- Chairman: Mike Wallace
- Coach: (Scotland) Craig Parslow
- Competition: Scottish National League (rugby league)

Uniforms
| Home colours | Away colours |

Aberdeen Warriors were a Scottish rugby league club based in the city of Aberdeen. The club was founded in 2010. They played in the Scottish National League and won the league on four occasions. Home games were played at the Woodside Sports Complex, also known to have played at Hazlehead Academy, Westdyke Leisure Centre and Rubislaw Playing Fields.

== History ==
Founded in the summer of 2010 as an U15 team going by the name Bon Accord Bulls, the venture was such a great success that a first team was set up the following February now called the Aberdeen Warriors. The club was formed by Craig Parslow, Thomas Lee and Ray Hall. In their debut season in 2011 the U15 reached their Grand Final while the first team went through their campaign unbeaten eventually beating Moray Titans in the Division 2 final 72-4 earning the club promotion. The following season the club initiated the North player development centre for under-age player groups which was created to coach and aid players in the region. On the field the club ran two domestic teams in the Scottish League, the first team having finished second in Division 1 were beaten in the Grand Final by defending champions Edinburgh Eagles 10-36 while their second team won the North League. 2013 was the year of the Warriors having finished top of the Northern Division they then went and beat the dominant Edinburgh Eagles for the first team 22–20 in the play-off semi-final and in the Grand Final they beat Easterhouse Panthers 30–28 to lift their first major title. 2014 began with a first appearance in the Challenge Cup, as Scottish champions, but they were defeated 4-46 by Pilkington Recs. By the end of that campaign they had retained their title remaining unbeaten after beating Edinburgh Eagles in the final 30–20. The following season brought another first round defeat in the Challenge Cup this time against Skirlaugh Bulls but by only 20-27 and a third successive title. In 2016 the title was clinched again this time against Strathmore Silverbacks 48-32 the season had begun with defeat again in the first round of the Challenge Cup against Northumbria University 16–42. 2017 started badly with a heavy defeat in the first round of the Challenge Cup 8–62 against Pilkington Recs.

The Warriors closed their doors in 2017 following changes in volunteers and league structure. A new committee was formed in February 2021 and the Warriors aim to be back in the 2022 season in the Scottish Conference and having started a new junior section.

== Challenge Cup ==
Following on from their win in the Scottish Grand final in 2013, the club were invited to take part in the Challenge Cup for the first time. Drawn away in the first round of the 2014 Challenge Cup against Pilkington Recs, the Warriors lost 4-46. The following years also brought first round exits. In 2015 they were beaten at Skirlaugh Bulls 20–27, by far their best performance, in 2016 they lost at home to Northumbria University 16-42 played at Rubislaw and in 2017 they were heavily beaten at home against Pilkington Recs 8-62.

== Honours ==
- Scottish National League (4): 2013, 2014, 2015, 2016
- Scottish Division 2 (1): 2012

== See also ==
- Rugby league in Scotland
- List of rugby league clubs in Britain
