= Paddy Coupar =

Former Scotland international rugby league footballer

Personal information
- Born: 26 June 1986 (age 39); Blairgowrie, Scotland

Playing information

Rugby league
- Position: Second-row
Club
Years	Team	Pld	T	G	FG	P
	Workington Town
2008–11	Edinburgh Eagles
	Total	0	0	0	0	0
Representative
Years	Team	Pld	T	G	FG	P
2008–11	Scotland	9	1	0	0	4

Rugby union
Club
Years	Team	Pld	T	G	FG	P
2015–2017	Dumfries Saints	11	2

Paddy Coupar (born 26 June 1986) is a former Scottish professional rugby league footballer who played for the Edinburgh Eagles in the Rugby League Conference Scotland Division. He previously played for Workington Town as a second-row. He represented Scotland at the 2008 Rugby League World Cup.

== Background ==
Coupar was born in Blairgowrie, Scotland.

== Career ==
For the 2008 Rugby League World Cup Couper, playing for the Edinburgh Eagles, was the only Scottish player not selected under the grandparent rule.

== International ==
Coupar was capped 9 times for Scotland.
