= Andy Todd (rugby league) =

Former Scotland international rugby league footballer

Personal information
- Full name: Andrew Todd
- Born: 15 April 1981 (age 43)

Playing information
- Position: wing
Club
Years	Team	Pld	T	G	FG	P
≤2007–≥07	Edinburgh Eagles
Representative
Years	Team	Pld	T	G	FG	P
2007	Scotland	2
- Source: As of 16 May 2012

Andrew Todd (born 15 April 1981) is a former professional rugby league footballer who played in the 2000s. He played at representative level for Scotland, and at club level for the Edinburgh Eagles.

== International honours ==
Andy Todd won 2 caps for Scotland while at Edinburgh Eagles in 2007 in losses against France and Wales, respectively.
