= David Lynn =

David Lynn may refer to:

- David Lynn (architect) (1873–1961), American architect
- David Lynn (golfer) (born 1973), English golfer
- David Lynn (rugby league) (born 1983), rugby league footballer for Scotland, and Edinburgh Eagles
- David Lynn (footballer), footballer who currently plays for Thame United.
