= Nico Nyemba =

St taf
- Born: Nico Nyemba; 31 March 1988 (age 38) Zimbabwe
- Height: 1.80 m (5 ft 11 in)
- Weight: 105 kg (16 st 7 lb)
- University: Manchester Metropolitan University

Rugby union career
- Position: Hooker
Amateur team(s)
Years	Team	Apps	(Points)
- Hillhead Jordanhill
- Glasgow Hawks
2012	Blaydon		
- Harrogate
2015-17	Ilkley		
2017-	Macclesfield		
Senior career
Years	Team	Apps	(Points)
2006-07	Glasgow Warriors	0	(0)
International career
Years	Team	Apps	(Points)
2015-	Zimbabwe		
- Rugby league career

Playing information
- Position: Second Row
Club
Years	Team	Pld	T	G	FG	P
	Carluke Tigers

Nico Nyemba is a Zimbabwe international rugby union player. He played at Hooker but could also play at Prop.

== Rugby Union career ==
=== Amateur career ===
Nyemba played for Hillhead Jordanhill in Scotland.

He then moved to play for Glasgow Hawks.

He signed for Blaydon from the Hawks in 2012.

He played for Harrogate.

Nyemba then played for Ilkley.

Nyemba now plays for Macclesfield.

=== Professional career ===
Nyemba came through the U16 age grade for Glasgow Warriors.

He played for Glasgow Warriors once in a friendly match against Scotland U20s in the 2006-07 season.

=== International career ===
Nyemba was capped for Zimbabwe. He received his first cap for Zimbabwe in 2015 playing against Tunisia in the African Nations Cup.

== Rugby League career ==
=== Amateur career ===
Nyemba played for Carluke Tigers.

== Outside of rugby ==
Nyemba works as a Physiotherapist in the NHS.
