= Scotland Rugby League =

Scottish sports league

- Founded: 1994
- IRL affiliation: 1994 (as observer); 2007– (as affiliate); 2011–24 (as full)
- RLEF affiliation: 2003
- Responsibility: Scotland
- Competitions: Scottish National League
- Website: scotlandrl.com

(Scotland)
- As of 30 June 2009

The Scotland Rugby League is the governing body for rugby league football in Scotland. It administers the Scottish National League and the Scotland national rugby league team.

The body joined the International Rugby League as an observer upon creation in 1994 before being upgraded to affiliate in 2007 and later full member in 2011.

In 2024, the body was downgraded to affiliate member due to noncompliance with the full membership criteria.

== Competitions ==
SRL Leagues
Name	Tier	Established	Winners
Scottish National League	1	1997	Strathmore Silverbacks
Scottish Cup	1	1997	Lomond Valley Raiders

== Scottish National Team ==
The Scotland national rugby league team represent Scotland in international rugby league football tournaments. and are nicknamed The Bravehearts. For most of its history, Scotland (along with the other home nations) were represented as Great Britain which ceased playing in the World Cup starting in 1995 (which Scotland did not qualify) and fully disbanded following the 2007 All Golds Tour, Following this, Scottish players play solely for Scotland, apart from the one off 2019 Great Britain Lions tour.

The team formally began in 1995, making them the newest international rugby league team in Great Britain. In their first match they played Ireland, losing narrowly. Since then, Ireland has become the team's main rival, the two teams having played each other many times in their short histories. In 2000 they qualified for their first ever World Cup, but failed to make an impact, losing all three of their group matches; however, their biggest losing margin was just 12 points. In 2008 they beat Wales over two matches to qualify for the 2008 World Cup.

In 2016, Scotland competed at their first every Rugby League Four Nations. They competed against Australia, New Zealand and England.

Scotland became the first nation outside of the three traditionally strongest Rugby League nations to take a competition point with their 18–18 draw against New Zealand in Workington. Scotland's other results were a 12–54 loss to Australia and a gallant 12–38 loss to England.

== See also ==
- Rugby league in Scotland
