= David Lynn (rugby league) =

Scotland international rugby league footballer

Personal information
- Full name: David Lynn
- Born: 13 July 1983 (age 41)

Playing information
- Position: Second-row
Club
Years	Team	Pld	T	G	FG	P
2007	Edinburgh Eagles
Representative
Years	Team	Pld	T	G	FG	P
2007	Scotland	2
- Source: As of 9 January 2021

David Lynn (born July 13, 1983) is a former professional rugby league footballer who played in the 2000s. He played as a second-row forward at representative level for Scotland, and at club level for the Edinburgh Eagles.

== International honours ==
David Lynn won caps for Scotland while at Edinburgh Eagles 2007 1-cap + 1-cap (sub).
