= Strathmore Silverbacks =

Scottish amateur rugby league club

Club information
- Full name: Strathmore Silverbacks
- Nickname: The Silverbacks
- Founded: 2015; 11 years ago

Current details
- Ground: Inchmacoble Park
- Coach: David Vernon
- Manager: Stuart Gray
- Competition: Scottish National League
- 2019: 1st (champions)

Uniforms
| Home colours | Away colours |

Strathmore Silverbacks are a Scottish rugby league team, part of Strathmore RFC, based in Forfar, Angus. They play in the Scottish National League. Their home ground is Inchmacoble Park.

== History ==
The Silverbacks were formed in 2015 by former rugby league professional and Scotland A internationals David Vernon, and Stuart Gray of Strathmore RFC. In their debut 2015 season under head coach Vernon they won the Edinburgh 9s and finished runner-up to champions Aberdeen Warriors, even beating the champs twice, including in their last game of the season 39-32. The following season saw them once again finish runner-up to the Warriors in the league and in the Grand Final played at Montrose they were beaten 32-48. In 2017 the Silverbacks were crowned Scottish Champions after a 32-30 victory over Edinburgh Eagles in Edinburgh, earning the right to represent Scotland in the 2018 Challenge Cup.

== Internationals ==
Despite their short history the club has already produced some Scottish internationals. In September 2015 Murray Mitchell was called up to the Scotland U19s for their match against Cumbria. The following year in July three players Ewan Maguire, Jack Wilson and Darren Bell played in the Scotland U19s defeat to England U19s at Post Office Road, Featherstone. In 2017 Niall Hall was called up to the Scotland students train on squad in preparation for the end of season World Cup in Australia. in November 2017 Murray Mitchell, Niall Hall and Ali Olivier were selected for the Scotland Under 23 team for the Commonwealth 9s in February 2018.

== Honours ==
- Edinburgh 9s (1): 2015
- Strathmore 9s Runners-Up (1): 2016
- Scotland 9s (1): 2017
- Scottish Cup Runners-Up (1): 2019
- Scottish Runners-Up (3): 2015, 2016, 2018, 2021
- Scottish Champions (2): 2017, 2019

== See also ==
- Rugby league in Scotland
- List of rugby league clubs in Britain
