= Fife Lions =

Scottish amateur rugby league club, based in Fife, East Scotland

Club information
- Full name: Fife Lions ARLFC
- Founded: 1997; 29 years ago
- Website: www.fifelions.org.uk

Current details
- Competition: Scottish National League

Fife Lions ARLFC are a rugby league club located in Fife, Scotland. They play in the Scottish National League.

The Fife Lions in recent years have been one of the dominant teams in the SRLC. Winning their maiden premiership in 2004, the Lions were undefeated throughout the regular season in 2005 only to become unstuck in the Grand Final, going down to the Edinburgh Eagles in the decider.

== History ==
Originally called the Linlithgow Lions, they played in the inaugural Scottish League in 1997 and played in it till the 2000 season.

They then relocated to Fife to become Fife Lions entering the Scottish Rugby League Conference for the 2002 season and made it to the final. Backing up in 2003, the Lions were defeated by the Edinburgh Eagles for the second year in a row in the decider.

In the 2004 season they beat the Edinburgh Eagles in the finals to become the Scottish Champions.

2005 looked destined to be the year of the Lions, going through the regular season unbeaten.

== Club honours ==
- Scottish Conference: 2004, 2006
- York 9s Archbishop Dolben cup: 2008

== See also ==
- Rugby league in Scotland
- List of rugby league clubs in Britain
