= Edinburgh Eagles =

Rugby league team in City of Edinburgh, Scotland

Club information
- Full name: Edinburgh Eagles Rugby League Football Club
- Nickname: The Eagles
- Founded: 1998; 28 years ago

Current details
- Ground: Royal High School, EH4 6AQ
- CEO: Vacant
- Chairman: Barry McGuffog
- Coach: Craig Robertson
- Manager: Andrew McPhail
- Captain: Lewis Clarke
- Competition: North East RL League
- 2019: 1st

Uniforms
Home colours

Edinburgh Eagles are a rugby league team based in Edinburgh, Scotland. The club plays in the Scottish National League and North East Rugby League. The club was founded in 1998. The Eagles have won the Scottish title a record 10 times. They currently play at Royal High School, but home games have been played at a number of grounds including Corstophine RFC and Broughton RFC.

== History ==
The Edinburgh Eagles club was founded in February 1998 and were admitted to the Scottish National League that same year, finishing as runners-up after losing out to Border Eagles in the final 14–40. The following season saw the club go one better when after defeating fellow Edinburgh side Portobello Playboys in the Grand Final 48–20, they lifted the Scottish title for the first time.

Edinburgh were invited to enter the 2000 Challenge Cup. At the first round stage on 4 December 1999 they were defeated 12–17 by Woolston Rovers. Despite losing just one match during the regular season they were beaten by Glasgow Bulls in the Grand Final 22–47. The following season the same two sides met in the final again, Eagles winning 30–16. That victory was the start of a hat-trick of triumphs as they beat Portobello Playboys 46–24 in 2002 and Fife Lions in 2003.

It was three more years before they won the title again, after losing to Fife Lions in the 2004 final they failed to reach the next two finals. There was also three first round exits in the Challenge Cup against Leigh East, Oulton Raiders and Heworth A.R.L.F.C. Another hat-trick of titles from 2007 was next as they saw off Fife Lions twice and Carluke Tigers in 2009, 18–10 in a game that went to extra-time.

In the challenge Cup, history was made by the club, when on 25 January 2009 Edinburgh became the first Scottish side to win a game in the competition, beating the RAF 18–16. In the second round they lost to Leeds Met University. They repeated this feat in 2010 when, after knocking out Gloucestershire Warriors 36–32, they lost out to Blackwood Bulldogs in the second round. In the league Carluke gained revenge by defeating the Eagles in the 2010 final 10–18. 2011 and 2012 brought the title count up to nine, with victories over Ayrshire Storm 26–10 and Aberdeen Warriors 36–10. Following three years out of the Finals the Eagles were runners up in 2017 behind Strathmore Silverbacks. After a 6-year wait 2018 saw the Eagles lift their 10th title with victory over Strathmore Silverbacks on points difference. 2019 saw the Eagles enter the North East Rugby league Competition which they went on to win, beating Jarrow Vikings in the grand final on golden point 38–34, along with defeating Strathmore for the 2019 Scottish Cup which sees them entered into the 2020 Challenge cup competition.

== Challenge Cup ==
Date	Opponents	Round	H/A	Score
4 December 1999	Woolston Rovers	1R	H	12–17
1 December 2001	Leigh East	1R	H	10–68
30 November 2002	Oulton Raiders	1R	A	8–26
30 November 2003	Heworth ARLFC	1R	A	8–34
2 February 2008	Normanton Knights	1R	A	8–38
25 January 2009	RAF	1R	A	18–16
16 February 2009	Leeds Met Univ	2R	A	6–20
24 January 2010	Gloucestershire Warriors	1R	A	36–32
14 February 2010	Blackwood Bulldogs	2R	H	16–28
18 February 2012	Stanley Rangers	1R	A	12–60
26 January 2019	Normanton Knights	1R	A	16–50

== Players earning international caps while at Edinburgh Eagles ==
The Eagles team has gained international recognition with several of its players being selected: Paddy Coupar, Giles Lomax, Nick Broere, Callum Cockburn, Craig Borthwick, David Lynn, Andrew Todd and John Cox have all come through the ranks of the Edinburgh Napier University Knights, Edinburgh Eagles and Scotland 'A' before going on to represent their country at full International level.

- Paddy Coupar won 9 caps from 2008 to 2011 for Scotland while at Edinburgh Eagles scoring 1 Try
- Callum Cockburn won 2 caps in 2011 for Scotland while at Edinburgh Eagles
- John Cox won 3 caps in 2009 for Scotland while at Edinburgh Eagles scoring 1 try
- Andy Todd won 2 caps in 2007 for Scotland while at Edinburgh Eagles
- David Lynn won 2 cap in 2007 for Scotland while at Edinburgh Eagles
- Giles Lomax won 1 cap in 2011 for Scotland while at Edinburgh Eagles
- Nick Broere won 1 cap in 2011 for Scotland while at Edinburgh Eagles
- Craig Borthwick won 1 cap in 2012 for Scotland while at Edinburgh Eagles
- Thomas Murray was called up to the 2012 Scotland European Cup Squad
- Dave Vernon was called up to the 2012 Scotland European Cup Squad
- Lewis Clarke won 6 caps between 2015 and 2022 for Scotland while at Edinburgh Eagles
- Finn Murphy was called up to the 2014 and 2015 Scotland European Cup Squad
- Finlay Hutchinson won 1 cap in 2015 for Scotland while at Edinburgh Eagles
- Craig Robertson won 2 caps in 2019 for Scotland while at Edinburgh Eagles scoring 1 try
- Terry Logan was called up to the 2019 Scotland European Cup Squad

== Honours ==
- Scottish National League (9): 1999, 2001, 2002, 2003, 2007, 2008, 2009, 2011, 2012, 2018
- Scottish Cup (1): 2019
- North East Rugby League (1): 2019

== See also ==
- Rugby league in Scotland
- List of rugby league clubs in Britain
