= Rugby League Raw =

Rugby League Raw was a regional BBC Sport television programme featuring rugby league action and behind-the-scenes footage from the National Leagues play-offs.

The series began in 2000 as a regional programme on Yorkshire Television and switched to the BBC in 2004.

The programme was narrated by Mark Chapman, and later, Tony Livesey, with match commentary from Dave Woods, David Oates and John Helm.

The documentary-style programme picked up two Royal Television Society awards and several nominations.

Rugby League Raw was broadcast in the BBC's North East & Cumbria, Yorkshire & North Midlands, East Yorkshire & Lincolnshire and North West regions and attracted over 400,000 viewers, despite its late night timeslot. The series can also be viewed online or downloaded using BBC iPlayer in the UK.

The 2007 series was the last to be made as Sky Sports began to show National League rugby.
