= Scottish National League (rugby league) =

- Founded: 1997
- Country: Scotland
- Number of clubs: 5
- Level on pyramid: 1
- Domestic cup: Challenge Cup
- League cup: Scottish National League Cup
- Most championships: Edinburgh Eagles (13 titles)
- Broadcaster: none
- Website: ScotlandRL.com

The Scottish National League is an amateur men's rugby league competition and the first tier of domestic rugby league in Scotland. The league formed in 1997 under the name The Scottish Conference three years after the formalisation of the sport in Scotland with the founding of Scotland Rugby League.

In 2007, the league was incorporated into the wider British rugby league system and renamed the RLC Scottish Regional forming one of an eventual nine Rugby League Conference regional divisions.

In 2011, the Rugby League Conference was dissolved due to a wider restructuring of amateur rugby league in Great Britain. The league became known as the Scottish National League for the 2012 season and came back under the control of Scotland Rugby League.

== History ==
The first domestic Scottish club were the Forth & Clyde Nomads who played in the 1995–96 North-East League but folded shortly before the announcement about a new Scottish rugby league competition. They made history when they won the first ever domestic competition, the Scottish Challenge Cup in 1996 beating Stirling University 30–24.

The first title was won by Lomond Valley Raiders who beat Central Centurions in the final of the first domestic competition. The following three seasons saw different champions each season, Border Eagles in their debut season in 1998, Edinburgh Eagles in 1999 against fellow Edinburgh side Portobello Playboys and Glasgow Bulls in 2000, before in 2001 the Eagles lifted the first of a hat-trick of title wins. In 2002 the league ran two 4 team divisions but reverted to one division the following season. The Eagles dominance was ended by Fife Lions in the 2004 Grand Final. The following season saw one season wonders Royal Scots Steelers from Edinburgh beat Fife Lions in the final. The Lions regained the title in 2006 before the Edinburgh Eagles returned for a second hat-trick run of title successes including the first two against Fife Lions. In 2010 a new name was carved onto the trophy when Carluke Tigers gained revenge for their previous seasons final defeat in extra-time against Edinburgh Eagles by defeating the all-conquering team 14–10. The Eagles lifted the next two titles against finals debutants Ayrshire Storm in 2011 and Aberdeen Warriors in 2012. In that 2011 season the league once again ran two divisions this time on a regional basis; Central and North. This lasted until 2014. Aberdeen Warriors won four straight titles between 2013 and 16. 2017 saw Strathmore Silverbacks lift their first title pipping the Edinburgh Eagles to the title. 2018 saw the Eagles return to the top of the pack after six years overturning the 2017 Champions Strathmore Silverbacks on points difference. 2019 saw Strathmore collect their second title pipping Glasgow RL to the title. Edinburgh Eagles picked up the league and cup double in 2021.

Many of the teams also run junior teams in the National Youth League.

== Current clubs ==
Scottish National League clubs
Club	Location
Borders Barbarians	Earlston
Edinburgh Eagles	Edinburgh
Glasgow RL	Glasgow
Tayside Silverbacks	Dundee/Forfar
West End Warriors	Glasgow

== Results ==
Season	League			RFL Challenge Cup (Note: The winner of the league has traditionally been invited to compete in the following season's Challenge Cup)		Ref
Season	Champions	Score	Runners-up	Team	Round	Ref
1997	Lomond Valley Raiders (1)	30–28	Central Centurions	—N/a		
1998	Border Eagles (1)	40–14	Edinburgh Eagles	—N/a		
1999	Edinburgh Eagles (1)	48–20	Portobello Playboys	Border Eagles	R1	
2000	Glasgow Bulls (1)	47–22	Edinburgh Eagles	Edinburgh Eagles	R1	
2001	Edinburgh Eagles (2)	30–16	Glasgow Bulls	Glasgow Bulls	R1	
2002	Edinburgh Eagles (3)	46–24	Portobello Playboys	Edinburgh Eagles	R1	
2003	Edinburgh Eagles (4)	?–?	Fife Lions	Edinburgh Eagles	R1	
2004	Fife Lions (1)	36–24	Edinburgh Eagles	Edinburgh Eagles	R1	
2005	Royal Scots Steelers (1)	56–46	Fife Lions	Fife Lions	QR	
2006	Fife Lions (2)	?–?	Moray Eels	—N/a		
2007	Edinburgh Eagles (5)	?–?	Fife Lions	Fife Lions	R1	
2008	Edinburgh Eagles (6)	54–4	Fife Lions	Edinburgh Eagles	R1	
2009	Edinburgh Eagles (7)	18–10 (AET)	Carluke Tigers	Edinburgh Eagles	R2	
2010	Carluke Tigers (1)	18–10	Edinburgh Eagles	Edinburgh Eagles	R2	
2011	Edinburgh Eagles (8)	26–10	Ayrshire Storm	Carluke Tigers	R1	
2012	Edinburgh Eagles (9)	36–10	Aberdeen Warriors	Edinburgh Eagles	QR	
2013	Aberdeen Warriors (1)	30–28	Easterhouse Panthers	—N/a		
2014	Aberdeen Warriors (2)	30–20	Edinburgh Eagles	Aberdeen Warriors	R1	
2015	Aberdeen Warriors (3)	—N/a	Strathmore Silverbacks	Aberdeen Warriors	R1	
2016	Aberdeen Warriors (4)	48–32	Strathmore Silverbacks	Aberdeen Warriors	R1	
2017	Strathmore Silverbacks (1)	32–30	Edinburgh Eagles	Aberdeen Warriors	R1	
2018	Edinburgh Eagles (10)	—N/a	Strathmore Silverbacks	Strathmore Silverbacks	R1	
2019	Strathmore Silverbacks (2)	—N/a	Fife Lions	Edinburgh Eagles	R1	
2020	No Season - Covid-19			—N/a (Note: Edinburgh Eagles, who took part in the first round of the 2020 Challenge Cup, competed in the North East Rugby League in the 2019 season.)		
2021	Edinburgh Eagles (11)	—N/a	Strathmore Silverbacks	—N/a		
2022	Forth Valley Vikings (1)	—N/a	Aberdeen Warriors	Edinburgh Eagles	R1	
2023	Edinburgh Eagles (12)	48–24	Forth Valley Vikings	Edinburgh Eagles	R1	
2024	Edinburgh Eagles (13)	30–24	Glasgow Rugby League	Edinburgh Eagles	R1	
2025	West End Warriors (1)	34–30 (g.p.)	Edinburgh Eagles	Edinburgh Eagles	R1	
2026	Match cancelled			—N/a		

=== Champions ===
List of teams by number of championship wins
	Club	Wins	RU	Winning years
1	Edinburgh Eagles	13	7	1999, 2001, 2002, 2003, 2007, 2008, 2009, 2011, 2012, 2018, 2021, 2023, 2024
2	Aberdeen Warriors	4	2	2013, 2014, 2015, 2016
3	Fife Lions	2	5	2004, 2006
4	Strathmore Silverbacks	2	4	2017, 2019
5=	Carluke Tigers	1	1	2010
5=	Forth Valley Vikings	1	1	2022
5=	Glasgow Bulls	1	1	2000
8=	Border Eagles	1	–	1998
8=	Loch Lomond Raiders	1	–	1997
8=	Royal Scots Steelers	1	–	2005
8=	West End Warriors	1	–	2025
12	Portobello Playboys	–	2	–
13=	Ayrshire Storm	–	1	–
13=	Central Centurians	–	1	–
13=	Easterhouse Panthers	–	1	–
13=	Glasgow Rugby League	–	1	–
13=	Moray Eels	–	1	–

== Seasons ==
=== 1997 season ===
The inaugural Scottish Conference kicked off on 27 July when Linlithgow Lions lost at home against Lomond Valley Raiders 50–68. Five teams contested that debut season, eventual champions Lomond Valley Raiders, runners-up Central Centurions, Linlithgow Lions, Inverness RL and Glasgow based Whitecraigs Warriors. The Raiders went through the season unbeaten and defeated the Central Centurions 30-28 in the final.

=== 1998 season ===
Five teams once again contested the newly retitled Scottish National League, new clubs Edinburgh Eagles, Border Eagles and Glasgow Bulls replaced Central Centurions, Inverness RL and Whitecraigs Warriors. The Border Eagles who had former Great Britain international Hugh Waddell in their ranks lifted the title when they beat Edinburgh Eagles in the inaugural Grand Final at Hillhead Sports Club in Glasgow 40–14.

=== 1999 season ===
The league increased to six clubs with Edinburgh based Portobello Playboys joining the league. The Grand Final was once again played at Hillhead Sports Club in Glasgow and was contested by the two Edinburgh clubs following their play-off victories against Border Eagles and Linlithgow Lions. In the final table toppers and favourites Edinburgh Eagles beat Portobello Playboys 48–20. As 1998 champions, the Border Eagles were entered into the 1999 Challenge Cup and on 6 December 1998 history was made when they took to the field against Wath Brow Hornets at Hillhead Sports Club losing by only 10–34.

=== 2000 season ===
The same six teams competed, one though, Lomond Valley Raiders changed their name to Rhu Raiders. Off the field Scotland Rugby League were officially recognised by SportScotland in October 1999 and on the field it seemed a certainty that Edinburgh Eagles would retain their title having gone through the season losing just one game to reach the Grand Final. Their opponents were Glasgow Bulls who having finished in 4th place with 5 wins and 5 defeats had reached the final following play-off wins over Rhu Raiders and league runners-up Borders. In the final the Bulls pulled off a massive upset in winning 47–22 at Royal High Corstorphine RFC in Edinburgh. As the 1999 season champions, the Eagles progressed into the 2000 Challenge Cup and a round 1 home meeting with top amateur side Woolston Rovers. After being 0-16 down at half-time the club nearly pulled off an almighty shock before going down 12–17.

=== 2001 season ===
The same six clubs competed again in a season disrupted by an outbreak of foot-and-mouth. Once again Edinburgh Eagles and Glasgow Bulls contested the Grand Final having gone through the season losing just one game, against each other. In the final played at West of Scotland FC in Glasgow the Eagles came out on top 30–16, at one point they led 30–0. In the 2001 Challenge Cup the Glasgow Bulls lost heavily to Wigan Rose Bridge 0-72.

=== 2002 season ===
2002 Division 1
Pos	Club	P	W	D	L	Pts
1	Portobello Playboys	6	6	0	0	12
2	Edinburgh Eagles	6	4	0	2	8
3	Glasgow Bulls	6	1	0	5	2
4	Dumbarton Dragons	6	1	0	5	2

2002 Division 2
Pos	Club	P	W	D	L	Pts
1	Fife Lions	6	6	0	0	12
2	Borders	6	3	0	3	6
3	Lanarkshire Storm	6	2	0	4	4
4	Clyde Buccaneers	6	1	0	5	2

The league expanded to two divisions of four. Division 1 consisted of reigning champions Edinburgh Eagles, runners-up Glasgow Bulls, Portobello Playboys and Dumbarton Dragons who were previously known as Rhu Raiders but had relocated to Loch Lomond. In Division 2 were Borders, Fife Lions who were previously called Linlithgow Lions but moved to Fife and two new clubs south Glasgow based Lanarkshire Storm and Clyde Buccaneers. Portobello won Division 1 remaining unbeaten and defeated 3rd placed Glasgow Bulls in the play-offs, in the other play-off Edinburgh Eagles saw off Division 2 winners Fife Lions 58–6. In the Grand Final played at Cavalry Park in Edinburgh Edinburgh Eagles beat the Portobello Playboys 46–24. In the 2002 Challenge Cup the Eagles lost at home to Leigh East 10–68.

=== 2003 season ===
2003 table
Pos	Club	P	W	D	L	Pts
1	Edinburgh Eagles	5	5	0	0	10
2	Fife Lions	5	4	0	1	8
3	Portobello Playboys	5	3	0	2	6
4	Clyde Buccaneers	5	1	0	4	2
5	Glasgow Bulls	5	1	0	4	2
6	Borders	5	1	0	4	2

The league reverted to one division and also lost two clubs. Lanarkshire Storm resigned after just one season and Dumbarton Dragons who as Lomond Valley Raiders won the first title, also failed to start the season. Reigning champions Edinburgh Eagles went through the season unbeaten and dispatched first time finalists Fife Lions in the final. In the 2003 Challenge Cup Edinburgh Eagles lost at home to Oulton Raiders in the first round 8-26.

=== 2004 season ===
2004 table
Pos	Club	P	W	D	L	Pts
1	Fife Lions	5	3	0	2	6
2	Edinburgh Eagles	4	2	0	2	4
3	Portobello Playboys	4	2	0	2	4
4	Clyde Buccaneers	5	2	0	3	4

The 2004 season featured four clubs following the withdrawal of Borders, which folded after being unable to secure a suitable home ground, and Glasgow Bulls, which took a hiatus while reorganizing after financial difficulties experienced by its benefactors, Bradford Bulls. The competition remained closely contested, with all four clubs still in contention for the Grand Final entering the final round of matches. The Grand Final was a repeat of the previous season's decider, although Fife Lions defeated Edinburgh Eagles 36-24 to win their first title. In the 2004 Challenge Cup, Edinburgh Eagles were eliminated in the first round after losing 34-8 to Heworth ARLFC.

=== 2005 season ===
2005 table
Pos	Club	P	W	D	L	Pts
1	Fife Lions	10	10	0	0	20
2	Royal Scots Steelers	10	6	1	3	13
3	Edinburgh Eagles	10	6	1	3	13
4	Moray Eels	10	4	0	6	8
5	Glasgow Bulls	10	3	0	7	6
6	Easterhouse Panthers	10	1	0	9	2

It was all change for this season as two clubs left the competition Portobello Playboys and Clyde Buccaneers one returned after a years absence Glasgow Bulls and three made their debut Royal Scots Steelers from Edinburgh, Moray Eels based at RAF Lossiemouth and east Glasgow based Easterhouse Panthers. Fife Lions finished top of the table winning all their matches to reach the Grand Final while new team Royal Scots Steelers caused a surprise and also reached the final after beating fellow Edinburgh side Edinburgh Eagles in the play-offs. In the final the Steelers shocked the Lions 56–46 to win in their debut season. 2004 champions Fife Lions represented Scotland in the 2005 Challenge Cup but were beaten at South London Sharks 10–42.

=== 2006 season ===
2006 table
Pos	Club	P	W	D	L	Pts
1	Fife Lions	10	8	1	1	17
2	Edinburgh Eagles	10	7	0	3	14
3	Moray Eels	10	4	1	5	9
4	Glasgow Bulls	10	3	0	7	6
5	Easterhouse Panthers	10	3	0	7	6
6	Paisley Hurricanes	10	3	0	7	6

2006 saw the loss of defending champions Royal Scots Steelers after just one campaign their place being taken up by Paisley Hurricanes. Fife Lions for the third year running finished top of the table and went on to claim their second championship. After getting past Glasgow Bulls in the semi-final they met and beat Moray Eels who had surprisingly beaten Edinburgh Eagles in the other semi-final. The 2005 champions, the Royal Scots Steelers, did not enter the 2006 Challenge Cup.

=== 2007 season ===
2007 table
Pos	Club	P	W	D	L	Pts
1	Fife Lions	10	9	0	1	18
2	Edinburgh Eagles	10	8	0	2	16
3	Paisley Hurricanes	10	5	0	5	10
4	Moray Eels	10	5	0	5	10
5	Easterhouse Panthers	10	3	0	7	6
6	Glasgow Bulls	10	0	0	10	0

The 2007 season brought stability to the league as the same clubs once again competed. The season also brought a name change to the Co-operative Scottish Rugby League Conference as the league formed part of the national Rugby League Conference. Fife Lions for the fourth season in a row finished top losing just one game, which was against their perennial contenders, Edinburgh Eagles. Not surprisingly the two clubs won their play-off semi-finals against Moray Eels and Paisley Hurricanes and in the final Edinburgh Eagles won to lift their fifth title. In the 2007 Challenge Cup Fife were beaten at Normanton Knights 8–46 in the first round.

=== 2008 season ===
2008 table
Pos	Club	P	W	D	L	Pts
1	Edinburgh Eagles	6	6	0	0	12
2	Carluke Tigers	6	4	0	2	8
3	Fife Lions	6	4	0	2	8
4	Paisley Hurricanes	6	3	0	3	6
5	Moray Eels	6	3	0	3	6
6	Easterhouse Panthers	6	1	0	5	2
7	Jordanhill Phoenix	6	0	0	6	0

The league lost one club but gained two as 7 clubs competed. Glasgow Bulls having lost all their games the previous season folded and were replaced in the west end of Glasgow by Jordanhill Phoenix and Carluke Tigers from Lanarkshire were the other new club. Edinburgh Eagles retained their title after thrashing Fife Lions in the final 54–4 at the Royal High Corstorphine RFC in Edinburgh. Debutants Carluke Tigers finished second in the league losing out to Fife Lions in the semi-final, in the other semi-final Edinburgh Eagles saw off Paisley Hurricanes. In the 2008 Challenge Cup the Eagles lost out to Normanton Knights in Yorkshire 8-38.

=== 2009 season ===
2009 table
Pos	Club	P	W	D	L	Pts
1	Edinburgh Eagles	7	7	0	0	14
2	Carluke Tigers	7	5	0	2	10
3	Fife Lions	7	5	0	2	10
4	Moray Eels	7	5	0	2	10
5	Hillfoots Rams	7	3	0	4	6
6	Jordanhill Phoenix	7	2	0	5	4
7	Easterhouse Panthers	7	1	0	6	2
8	Victoria Knights	7	0	0	7	0

Like the previous season the league lost one club and gained two as the competition reached eight clubs. Paisley Hurricanes surprisingly called it a day despite having reached the play-offs the previous two seasons. Coming in were Hillfoots Rams who would be based at Hillfoots RFC in Clackmannanshire and Victoria Knights from south Glasgow and playing out of Nethercraigs, a club that was already running several successful youth sides. On the field Edinburgh Eagles once again dominated remaining unbeaten all season and lifting the title after beating Carluke Tigers in the final albeit after extra time 18–10 at GHA RFC in Glasgow. In the 2009 Challenge Cup the Eagles made history when they became the first Scottish side to win a game beating the RAF in the first round 18–16, in the second round they lost narrowly at Leeds Met 6-20.

=== 2010 season ===
2010 table
Pos	Club	P	W	D	L	Pts
1	Edinburgh Eagles	7	7	0	0	14
2	Carluke Tigers	7	6	0	1	12
3	Moray Eels	7	4	1	2	9
4	Ayrshire Storm	7	4	0	3	8
5	Fife Lions	7	3	0	4	6
6	Easterhouse Panthers	7	2	1	4	5
7	Falkirk Romans	7	1	0	6	2
8	Forth & Clyde Nomads	7	0	0	7	0

There were changes again before the season commenced with eight clubs. Three teams departed Hillfoots Rams after one season, and two Glasgow clubs Jordanhill Phoenix and Victoria Knights who returned to being a youth set-up. Joining the ranks were the first ever Scottish rugby league club Forth & Clyde Nomads who had been formed in 1995 and had competed in the North-East League in England. The other two clubs were newly formed, Ayrshire Storm based at Irvine and Falkirk Romans. Reigning champions Edinburgh Eagles finished top of the table closely followed by the previous seasons runners-up Carluke Tigers. In the play-offs Carluke shocked the Eagles by winning in Edinburgh 24–16 to reach the Grand Final. Edinburgh got past Moray Eels who had put out Ayrshire Storm to eventually reach the Final. In the final played at GHA RFC in Glasgow Carluke repeated their play-off victory to lift their first title 18–10. In the 2010 Challenge Cup the Eagles once again won in the first round beating Gloucestershire Warriors away 36–32. In the second round they were beaten by Welsh club Blackwood Bulldogs 16–28 at Meggetland Sports Complex in Edinburgh.

=== 2011 season ===
The league structure was changed with the re-introduction of two divisions effectively north and south, but actually called the Premier Division and Division 1. Two clubs left Falkirk Romans and Forth & Clyde Nomads both after competing in one season. Newcomers who all joined Division 1 were Aberdeen Warriors, Ross Sutherland RL and Elgin based Moray Titans. In the Premier Division, Edinburgh Eagles led the way winning all their games followed by Ayrshire Storm behind these two, who would contest the Grand Final, were Carluke Tigers, Fife Lions and Easterhouse Panthers. Division 1 was won by Aberdeen Warriors who like Edinburgh won all their games behind them came Moray Tians, Moray Eels and finally Ross Sutherland RL. In the Premier Division Grand Final Edinburgh saw off debutant finalists Ayrshire 26–10 at GHA RFC in Glasgow. In the 2011 Challenge Cup Carluke Tigers lost away at Woolston Rovers 18–44.

=== 2012 season ===
The Scottish rugby league left the English Rugby League Conference umbrella and under a brand new title Scottish Conference set about on an independent course. Two leagues remained this time renamed the Central Conference and the Northern Conference. Unfortunately the champions of 2010 Carluke Tigers failed to make the start replacing them were East Lothian Hawks from Haddington. The competition also saw both Edinburgh Eagles and Aberdeen Warriors run 'A' teams. In the Central Conference Edinburgh Eagles finished top ahead of Ayrshire Storm who they then beat in the play-off 52–18. In the Northern Conference Aberdeen Warriors came top ahead of Edinburgh Eagles 'A' who they beat 80–4 in their play-off. In the Grand Final played at Falkirk RFC Edinburgh won their 9th title winning 36–10. In the 2012 Challenge Cup Edinburgh were heavily defeated at Stanley Rangers 12–60.

=== 2013 season ===
2013 Central Conference
Pos	Club	P	W	D	L	Pts
1	Easterhouse Panthers	8	7	0	1	14
2	Edinburgh Eagles	8	7	0	1	14
3	Ayrshire Storm	8	4	0	4	8
4	Fife Lions	8	2	0	6	4
5	Victoria Knights	8	0	0	8	0

2013 Northern Conference
Pos	Club	P	W	D	L	Pts
1	Aberdeen Warriors	6	6	0	0	12
2	Moray Titans	6	3	0	3	6
3	Moray Eels	6	2	0	4	4
4	Ross Sutherland RL	6	1	0	5	2

For the 2nd year, Scottish Conference East Lothian Hawks and the two 'A' teams of Edinburgh and Aberdeen did not compete while Victoria Knights returned as a senior side for the second time following their campaign in 2009. In the Central Conference Easterhouse Panthers defeated Victoria Knights 134–0 in the opening round and went on to finish top ahead of Edinburgh Eagles with Ayrshire Storm, Fife Lions and Victoria Knights following. In the Northern Conference Aberdeen Warriors dominated finishing top and unbeaten, followed by Moray Titans, Moray Eels and finally Ross Sutherland RL. The play-off semi-finals brought victories for the two league leaders Easterhouse Panthers against Moray Titans and Aberdeen Warriors 22–20 against Edinburgh Eagles. In the Grand Final at Falkirk RFC the Aberdeen Warriors won their first title 30–28 against the Easterhouse Panthers.

=== 2014 season ===
2014 table
Pos	Club	P	W	D	L	Pts
1	Aberdeen Warriors	6	6	0	0	12
2	Edinburgh Eagles	6	2	0	4	4
3	Ayrshire Storm	6	2	0	4	4
4	Easterhouse Panthers	6	2	0	4	4

The Scottish rugby league secured its first sponsor when Deuchars IPA agreed a four-year deal. The competition named Deuchars IPA National League suffered from a plethora of clubs leaving, which was partly due to the RFL withdrawing all their funding to the Scottish Rugby League. Two-time former champions Fife Lions were the biggest name to go; after appearing in the previous 17 campaigns they decided to call it a day after a couple of seasons of struggle both on and off the pitch. Victoria Knights lasted just one season for the second time, deciding to fully concentrate on their youth clubs. Also leaving were three clubs from the north: Ross Sutherland RL, Moray Eels and Moray Titans. The season itself saw Aberdeen Warriors lay down a marker for their continued dominance as they went through the season undefeated, leading them to their second title after beating Edinburgh Eagles 30–20 in the final played in Aberdeen at the 'Hazlehead Academy. In the 2014 Challenge Cup champions Aberdeen Warriors made their debut but were heavily beaten at Pilkington Recs 4-46.

=== 2015 season ===
Four clubs once again competed but Ayrshire Storm left to be replaced by Forfar based Strathmore Silverbacks. The season saw a combination of home and away games and nines tournaments, hosted by all the clubs, to decide the two finalists. By the end of the season Aberdeen Warriors had qualified for the Grand Final along with debutants Strathmore Silverbacks but were then proclaimed champions after no final was played. In the 2015 Challenge Cup the Warriors lost narrowly at top side Skirlaugh Bulls 20–27.

=== 2016 season ===
2016 table
Pos	Club	P	W	D	L	Pts
1	Aberdeen Warriors	6	6	0	0	12
2	Strathmore Silverbacks	6	4	0	2	8
3	Easterhouse Panthers	6	1	0	5	2
4	Edinburgh Eagles	6	1	0	5	2

The same four clubs competed for the title with reigning champions Aberdeen Warriors and Strathmore Silverbacks finishing as the top two and therefore reaching the Grand Final. In the final underdogs Strathmore gave a good account of themselves before going down to a 48–32 defeat to the Warriors who registered their fourth straight title success at Montrose RFC. In the 2016 Challenge Cup Aberdeen lost at Northumbria University 16–42.

=== 2017 season ===
The 2017 season featured three clubs: Aberdeen Warriors, Edinburgh Eagles and Strathmore Silverbacks. In July 2017, Aderdeen announced that the club was to fold/ In the Grand Final Strathmore won 32–30 against Edinburgh.

=== 2018 season ===
In the 2018 season, the competition had only two teams and the title was contested over two legs. Edinburgh took the title 64-60 on aggregate having won the first game 42-34 against Strathmore and losing the second game 22-26.

=== 2019 season ===
2019 table
Pos	Club	P	W	D	L	Pts
1	Strathmore Silverbacks (C)	4	4	0	0	12
2	Glasgow Rugby League	4	2	0	2	8
3	Fife Lions	4	0	0	0	4

A three team competition took place in 2019 with Edinburgh joining the North East League and being replaced by Fife Lions and Glasgow Rugby League. Strathmore were the champions.

=== 2020 season ===
The 2020 season was cancelled due to the COVID-19 pandemic.

=== 2021 season ===
2021 table
Pos	Club	P	W	D	L	B	Pts
1	Edinburgh Eagles (C)	4	4	0	0	1	10
2	Strathmore Silverbacks	4	3	0	1	1	8
3	Forth Valley Vikings	4	2	1	2	1	5
4	Fife Lions	4	1	0	3	1	4
5	Glasgow Rugby League	4	0	1	4	1	3

In the 2021 season, five teams took part with the addition of new club Forth Valley Vikings and the return of Edinburgh Eagles who won the competition.

=== 2022 season ===
Four teams were to take part the 2022 season: Aberdeen Warriors, Forth Valley Vikings, Glasgow Rugby League and Fife Lions, however, Fife forfeited all of their matches.

=== 2023 season ===
On 22 May, Aberdeen Warriors withdrew from the league over governance concerns by Scotland Rugby League. Edinburgh Eagles returned to the competition to compete alongside Forth Valley Vikings and Glasgow Rugby League. Edinburgh Eagles defeated Forth Valley Vikings 48–24 in the final.

=== 2024 season ===
Edinburgh won the final 30–24 against Glasgow.

=== 2025 season ===
2025 table
Pos	Club	P	W	D	L	Pts
1	West End Warriors	6	4	0	2	8
2	Edinburgh Eagles	6	4	0	2	8
3	Forth Valley Vikings	6	3	0	3	6
4	Glasgow Rugby League	6	1	0	5	2

In the 2025 season, newly formed West End Warriors joined the league to make up a four-team competition with Edinburgh Eagles, Forth Valley Vikings and Glasgow Rugby League. The Warriors finished top of the table and in the final they defeated Edinburgh Eagles 34–30 in golden point extra time.

=== 2026 season ===
For the 2026 season, Scotland Rugby League announced that the competition would be expanded to six teams with the addition of Tayside Silverbacks and Borders Barbarians to the league. However, Forth Valley Vikings withdrew before the start of the season. In August, Edinburgh Eagles were due to play the Tayside Silverbacks in the grand final, but when the Silverbacks were unable to fulfil the fixture they were replaced by the Border Barbarians who were also unable to field a team and the match was cancelled.

=== Clubs by season ===
Notes:

- Fife Lions were known as Linlithgow Lions (1997–2001)
- Lomond Valley Raiders were known as Rhu Raiders (2000–01) and Dumbarton Dragons (2002)
- No 2020 season played

== See also ==
- Rugby league in Scotland
- List of rugby league competitions
