= Scotland national rugby league team =

Team in international rugby league football

Scotland

Team information
- Nickname: The Bravehearts
- Governing body: Scotland Rugby League
- Region: Europe
- Head coach: Nathan Graham
- Captain: Dale Ferguson
- Most caps: Danny Brough (25)
- Top try-scorer: David Scott (10)
- Top point-scorer: Danny Brough (136)
- IRL ranking: 20th

Uniforms
First colours

Team results
- First international
- Ireland 26–22 Scotland (Dublin, Ireland; 13 August 1995)
- Biggest win
- Italy 0–104 Scotland (Padua, Italy; 17 October 2009)
- Biggest defeat
- Australia 84–0 Scotland (Coventry, England; 21 October 2022)
- World Cup
- Appearances: 4 (first time in 2000)
- Best result: Quarterfinals (2013)

The Scotland national rugby league team represent Scotland in international rugby league football tournaments. Following the break-up of the Great Britain team in 2007, Scottish players play solely for Scotland, apart from occasional Southern Hemisphere tours, for which the Great Britain team is expected to be revived. The team is nicknamed the Bravehearts.

Though its foundations may date back to as early as 1904, the team formally began in 1995, making them the newest international rugby league team in Great Britain. In their first match they played Ireland, losing narrowly. Since then, Ireland has become the team's main rival, the two teams having played each other many times in their short histories. In 2000 they qualified for their first ever World Cup, but failed to make an impact, losing all three of their group matches; however, their biggest losing margin was just 12 points. In 2008 they beat Wales over two matches to qualify for the 2008 World Cup.

Scotland play in a dark blue strip, similar to the nation's football and rugby union teams, with blue shirt, shorts and socks. A blue and white shield with a thistle, the Scottish emblem, is the team's badge. The shirt has rarely been significantly changed, although in the early days of the team, white was also used on the shirts.

As of December 2025, the team is ranked 27th in the IRL Men's World Rankings, with their highest ranking of fourth having been reached in 2016. Englishman Steve McCormack is the team's coach, having coached since 2004, with Danny Brough captaining the side.

== History ==
=== Foundations ===
It could be argued that the foundations for the Scottish team began in 1904. On 5 April 1904 England played an international match against the "Other Nationalities", a team of Welshmen and Scotsmen, in Wigan. It was a 12-a-side game. Of the twelve players who played for the Other Nationalities team two of them were Scotsmen coming from Northern Union clubs, including captain George Frater. After 80 minutes the Other Nationalities had beaten England 9–3. The team carried on for another two years, playing England in 1905, losing 26–11, and in 1906, drawing 3–3. The team was regularly revived, most notably in the early 1930s, and in 1949.

=== 1990s ===
==== The Wolfhounds ====
Both Scotland and Ireland had been developing rugby league in their respective nations for several years. This was especially true at student level, with a Scotland student team having played regularly since 1987 and having competed in the 1992 Students World Cup. But it was decided that the time was right for an open-age national team to attempt to be entered into an Emerging Nations Tournament that would coincide with the 1995 World Cup, that the Rugby League International Federation had recently announced.

Both Scotland Rugby League and Rugby League Ireland arranged a match on 13 August 1995 at the Royal Dublin Showground in Dublin, Ireland. However the Rugby Football League provided no financial support to either team. Luckily the Scotland team managed to get sponsored, and the money was used for the ferry crossing, but each individual player had to pay for basic accommodation. The Scotland squad was largely made up of players who had played in the student squads, but a few professionals were also included.

Just before the start of the match, after the Scottish team had spent a night at a youth hostel, the Irish Rugby Football Union prevented the teams from getting changed at the arranged Blackrook College. A new location was quickly found but it was half a mile away from the ground, and so the players had to walk that distance in their playing kit.

The match was looking like it would be scoreless at half-time until just before the break, centre Lee Child scored to put Ireland ahead. After the break Scotland hit back, Sean Cusack scoring Scotland's first ever try. Gavin Manclark then scored to propel Scotland into the lead. This did not last long though, as Leo Casey scored for Ireland in the 55th minute. Ireland then scored again, with Seamus McCallion going over. Four minutes later in the 69th minute, Scotland quickly scored two tries with Manclark and Shelford sealing the eight points. However, this was not enough as Ketteridge had only kicked three conversions compared to Ireland's Ian Devery who had kicked five. The match finished with Ireland winning 26–22, but Thompson for Scotland did win Man of the Match.

==== 1995 Emerging Nations tournament ====
After this international Scotland were allowed to take part in the Emerging Nations Tournament, which was to be held in England. On 16 October 1995 at Featherstone they faced Russia, who had been playing international rugby league since 1991, in their opening game in Group A. Coached by former Great Britain and England (despite the fact he was Scottish) player, George Fairbairn, who put together a team of former Scotland students, rugby union players, and a few league professionals including Alan Tait, who played for Leeds, and who would captain the side. The whole of the Scotland team had hired kilts to be worn pre-match.

The game started off well for Scotland, student James How scoring after just four minutes. And then minutes later Tait doubled the Bravehearts lead. But the Russia Bears dragged themselves back into the match, stand-off Victor Netchaev scoring first, and in the 30th minute Alexander Otradnov scored. Scotland were ahead though at half-time by four points because Russia had failed to convert their tries. In the second half it was all Scotland with only Andrey Scheglov's drop goal adding to the Bears points. On the other hand, former Great Britain international Hugh Waddell, Ali Blee and Tait again all scored to seal a Scottish victory.

Group One Table	W	L	F	A	PTS
Cook Islands	3	0	143	36	6
Scotland	2	1	82	46	4
Russia	1	2	57	118	2
United States	0	3	48	130	0

Scotland's second match was against the United States in Northampton, traditionally a rugby union city. The Tomahawks were made up of AMNRL players but Scotland took a while to get going. In the twelfth minute winger Rory Lewis unexpected put America ahead, which caused The Bravehearts to start playing well for the remainder of the first half, Scotland eventually going into the second half leading three tries to one. Graeme Thompson had kicked a penalty very early on in the game, and then after the America try added another four points. McAlister, who had missed the conversion, set up Ketteridge and Smith for Scotland's second and third tries respectively. The Bravehearts extended their lead in the second half, Shelford going over and then David Niu, who could have played for Scotland because of his Dunfermline born mother, got one back for the States. But Scotland put a victory beyond doubt with Alan Tait setting up Shelford twice for his hat-trick. Late in the game Niu and Steve Tait scored for the United States and Scotland respectively to end the match 38–16 in Scotland's favour.

Scotland's two victories, coupled with the Cook Islands ability to beat the United States and Russia too, set up a deciding match in Castleford where the winner would reach the final. 3,000 people turned up to first see Thompson score a penalty after 15 minutes, but then Nigere Tariu slid over to put the Islanders ahead. Just before the break however, Tait charged through three players to put Scotland back in the game. In the second half the Cook Islands, with several NRL players in their ranks, showed their strength as Sonny Shepherd scored a controversial try as Scottish players complained about the grounding. From a play the ball Shepherd went over again and in the 73rd minute Tariu scored a converted try. The Bravehearts did get a late consolation, skipper Tait going over for Scotland's last try before Islander Ali Davys sealed Scotland's fate with a drop-goal. The match finished Scotland 10–21 Cook Islands. In the final the Cook Islands beat Ireland 22–6 in Bury to win the tournament and secure a place in the next World Cup. Despite losing this final match the Scotland team and supporters thought that they had done very well considering how young the team was and how good their performances had been against Russia and the USA.

==== Glasgow matches ====
In 1996 the Rugby League International Federation rewarded Scotland with full international status which meant that they could start organising more fixtures and there was no longer a limit to the number of professionals they could use. Before this status Scotland had been restricted to playing just three professionals in a match.

The guys are all gutted about it and I am gutted for them. They had come back so well after a mediocre first half.

— Coach George Fairbairn after the match.

Scotland faced Ireland again in August of that year, and it was to be their first home game, with the match being played at the Firhill Stadium in Glasgow. After 5 minutes Alan Tait touched down with Matt Crowther converting. And then hooker Danny Russell and professional Darren Shaw gave the Bravehearts a 14–0 lead at half-time. In the second half after 52 minutes Lee Hanlon scored Ireland's only try of the match, but Martin Ketteridge soon kicked a penalty for Scotland to extend the lead. In the closing stages of the match, after three Irish players had been sin-binned, Darrall Shaleford and Nick Mardon got themselves on the scoreboard with a try each. The match finished Scotland 26–6 Ireland. This is the only time in eight attempts that Scotland have beaten Ireland.

A second match in Glasgow was held in July 1997 against France. The match was to end in controversy surrounding a late try and French referee Thierry Alibert. France had got off to a good start, with Freddie Banquet scoring before Danny Russell and Gary Christie scored a try each to send the Scots in front. However, with a few minutes to go before half-time, Jerome Guisset scored under the posts to give the French side a 12–10 lead after 40 minutes. After half-time France extended their lead through Fabien Devecchi but once again Scotland rallied together and Stuart McCarthy scored a crucial try, which was not converted. In the 70th minute Matt Crowther scored a try, and converted it, to put Scotland into a 20–18 lead. With just seconds remaining, a storm brewed when referee Alibert awarded a try to France's Arnauld Dulac. The Bravehearts and coaching staff said that the ball was knocked on, and therefore a scrum should have occurred. English touch judge Peter Walton signalled the knock-on but play continued. The match finished Scotland 20–22 France.

==== Clash of the Nations ====
The Clash of the Nations was a new tournament designed to make November 1998 a month of international league as Great Britain was touring the Southern Hemisphere. Scotland, France and Ireland would play two matches each and the winner of the two matches would be crowned champion.

Scotland first faced France in Perpignan, the first match since they were controversially denied a victory in 1996. New coach Billy McGinty promised "the strongest ever Scotland squad" and just three players survived from Scotland's last international match. Débutant Jason Flowers put Scotland ahead, before France levelled the scores. But Danny Arnold once again put the Bravehearts ahead. Scotland excelled and Jason Roach further strengthened Scotland's lead before France narrowed the lead to four points at half-time. In the 55th minute France scored to take the lead for the first time in the match. Roach got his second try, but France retaliated by scoring one of their own. Ten minutes from full-time France scored another try to confirm the two points. The match finished France 26–22 Scotland, with Lee Penny earning Man of the Match award.

France went onto beat Ireland in their second match, therefore clinching the trophy, however Scotland still played Ireland in Glasgow, the first meeting between these nations since 1995. The first half was to prove uneventful, with Ireland scoring a single try to make the score 6–0 after 40 minutes. On the 46th minute Ireland drifted into a 10-point lead, but John Duffy kept the Bravehearts in the match with 20 minutes of the match remaining. Logan Campbell got a try for Scotland but then Ireland scored another, a drop-goal to win the match 17–10. Colin Wilson was awarded the Man of the Match award, and significantly became the first player from the Scottish Conference domestic league to represent Scotland.

With two defeats from the tournament Scotland finished bottom of the table.

==== Triangular Challenge ====
England have competed in 26 European Nations Cups, the first in 1935. In the past the tournament has been axed and revived many times, and it was stopped for six years because of the Second World War. From 1935 to 1949 (minus the war years) England played France and Wales annually, and won the tournament in 1935, 1946, 1947 and 1948. From 1950 to 1956 an Other Nationalities team were added as the fourth team in the competition (except in 1956 when Wales did not field a team). During those years England won in 1950 and 1954. Since then the tournament has run for some seasons, but never for more than five years at a time. But from 1970 to 1996 England won it six out of a possible nine times. In 2003 the tournament was revived and England comfortably won, beating her old rivals plus Scotland, Ireland and Russia. England beat the same opponents to win the cup again in 2004. This was the last time England competed, they were replaced by Georgia. The cup ran for just one more year before it was axed again. It has not since returned. In total England have won the cup fourteen times.

With The Clash of the Nations tournament over, the Celtic nations were to play each other once over October and November in a new competition. The matches were to coincide with the Great Britain versus Australia matches, in which Great Britain ended up being badly beaten. Dale Laughton was the only Scotman in the Great Britain team and so the Bravehearts didn't suffer from withdrawals as much as Ireland and Wales did. It is generally regarded that the Rugby Football League made the same mistakes as the 1998 tournament with matches being held on Friday nights and competing against both the football and rugby union seasons and consequently attendances were very low for the matches. The first of Scotland's matches was against Wales in which many of the best Welsh players were with Great Britain. Scotland took the lead through Danny Arnold but The Dragons quickly made the game level. Captain Danny Russell went over for Scotland's second try, but once again Wales hit back within minutes. Andrew Lambert scored just before half-time for The Bravehearts but the lead did not last long after the break with Wales scoring. However, the Welsh were unable to reply to the next four tries, with Mike Wainwright and Matt Crowther each getting themselves onto the scoreboard and both Lambert and Arnold getting their second tries. A win or a draw would seal Scotland's place at the top of the table but Ireland mixture of Super League and local players were too good for Scotland. They raced into a ten-point lead before Russell and Arnold, with Crowther converting one, allowed Scotland to claw their way back into the match. In the final quarter the Bravehearts fell apart, leaking in 21 points to lose the match.

=== 2000s ===
==== 2000 World Cup ====
Scotland were placed in Group 4 in the 16-team Rugby League World Cup for 2000, which was held in the United Kingdom and France. This meant that they would face Ireland, Samoa and New Zealand Maori, with one match being played at Glasgow, and one match being played in Edinburgh. Out of the four teams, two would then qualify for the Quarter Finals, playing the top teams from other groups. The Scots World Cup campaign was criticised though, before the tournament was even started when the 24-man squad was named, as not one of the players were born in Scotland.

In their first match after the World Cup campaign, Scotland faced France in the southern French town of Lézignan-Corbières. Shaun McRae, citing his domestic coaching at Hull FC, departed as Scotland coach and Glasgow-born Billy McGinty took over the role with the then Swinton Lions coach and former Great Britain player Mike Gregory taking the role of assistant coach. The squad for this match included 13 survivors from the World Cup matches and three new players who were each earning their first international cap. The Scots got off to a great start, scoring three tries in the first 13 minutes and never looked back as they won the match 42–20. The heat in the French summer was thought to be a problem going into the match, but Scotland scored seven tries in total to record their first win against the French and arguably their best win yet in international competition. Two tries each were scored by Danny Arnold and Jason Flowers, and Matt Crowther converted all seven tries. Seven years later this victory is Scotland's biggest win and is still recognised as one of their best amongst supporters.

==== European Cup ====
Scotland joined the prestigious European Nations Cup tournament in 2003, now being regarded as the seventh best national nation. This newly expanded competition, which also featured Russia and Ireland for the first time, as well as England A, France and Wales, was split into two groups with the winner of each group playing each other to become the competition's champions. Scotland were placed in a group with rivals Ireland and France. In May 2003, several months before the start of the tournament, Scotland Rugby League announced that Mike Gregory would become the new coach of the Scottish team, with David Lyon being appointed as his assistant. However it was later announced that due to Mike Gregorys commitments to Wigan Warriors, McGinty will continue to coach the side. Scotland's first match was against Ireland at Old Anniesland. The Scots lost by just two points, with Lee Penny, Danny Arnold and Jason Roach all scoring tries for Scotland, but John Duffy had missed one of his crucial four goals. Scotland were 12–2 up after 21 minutes and were level at half-time, but Irish substitute Karl Fitzpatrick gave the Wolfhounds the win in the last few minutes of the match. With France then beating Ireland in Dublin, Scotland now knew that they could clinch first place. The match held in Narbonne, between France and Scotland turned out to be closely fought. However, the Scots came out on top with an Andrew Henderson try and two Oliver Wilkes goals sealing the victory by two points. This scoreline meant that all three teams had finished on two points, but it was France, with the better points difference, that went on to face England in the final.

The 2004 competition followed the same plan but this time the Bravehearts were with Ireland and Wales. These two teams had already played each other a week earlier with the result and Irish victory. Both sides scored four tries, but it was the kicking of Danny Brough that helped Scotland to beat the Dragons by 30 points to 22 in Glasgow. The match drew over a thousand spectators and was the first time Scotland had won at home for five years. Just five days later though, the team had to play their second game against the Irish Wolfhounds in Ireland. Despite a try from Spencer Miller and three successful kicks by Danny Brough, the Irish ran out easy winners with the match ending 43–10 and thus ending Scotlands campaign in the cup.

==== 2008 World Cup Qualifying ====
On 17 May 2006 Scotland received word that they would play two matches against Wales for a place in the 2008 World Cup. The two matches of Group 1 (there were two European groups) would be contested in late 2006 and 2007, with the first being in Bridgend and the second being in Glasgow.

Before the first match, coach Steve McCormack had time with the players in training camps in Huddersfield and Swansea, and admitted that he was not threatened by the likes of Super League giants Iestyn Harris and Lee Briers in the Welsh team. This is despite many fans and journalists favouring the Dragons to easily win. McCormack later named his squad for the match, which included a mixture of Super League, National League and Rugby League Conference players. Five of them would be making their début, but long-serving player Ian Henderson, who had played in every Scottish match since 2001, was unable to play for in this match.

Scotland started well in Bridgend with Wade Liddell giving the Bravehearts the lead after just 8 minutes. This try was converted by Gareth Morton. But things got bad as Wales pulled a try back through Richard Johnson, and then Danny Brough was sinbinned for dissent on 26 minutes. In the next ten minutes a Wales team minus Iestyn Harris, who failed a fitness test prior to the match, capitalised on Scotland's shortfall and scored two tries to create a 14–6 lead going into half-time. However, after the break the Scots immediately got back into the match, Danny Brough singlehandedly scoring a try after 70 seconds of the interval, and Jamie Benn a little later leeching on to a grubber kick. Mick Nanyn missed both conversions and so the scores were tied. On the 67th minute Scotland went in front, Nanyn converting his own try. And to seal a 21–14 victory Danny Brough scored a drop-goal. He would later get Man of the Match award.

To prepare for the second qualification match, Scotland travelled to Perpignan to play test nation France. Scotland rested several key players, like Danny Brough and Ian Henderson, and gave caps to six début players. It turned out to be a bad decision as Scotland suffered their heaviest defeat in their history. After 15 minutes Scotland were trailing 18–0, and despite tries from Benn, Nanyn and Paterson, plus two successful conversions from Nanyn, France were always well ahead. The match finished France 46–16 Scotland.

Before the second qualification match in Glasgow, Wales were still confident of victory with the Dragons assistant coach Kevin Ellis saying that his Welsh team had some fantastic players, and that it was the best since Wales golden era of 1991–1995. But Scotland had the advantage going into the match, for a win or draw or even a small loss would guarantee them a place in the cup. Before the match Danny Brough was announced as captain before the match, thus earning his sixth cap too.

In the first half of the match Wales were on top, with Scotland only managing to score four points overall, two penalties by Danny Brough. Richard Fletcher had been carried off after an aerial collision, which caused the game to be stopped for six minutes. At half time the score was 14–4 in favour of the Dragons, meaning Scotland would not qualify. In the 52nd minute Ben Fisher darted over the line to score Scotland's first try. Importantly this was converted by Danny Brough. And with seven minutes remaining Jamie Benn latched onto Mick Nanyn's speculative pass to score Scotland's second try, which Brough converted. Wales scored late on but it was not enough. The match finished Scotland 16–18 Wales, with an aggregate score of Scotland 37–32, and Mick Nanyn received Man of the Match award.

==== 2008 World Cup ====
On 9 July 2008, Scotland Rugby League announced that Steve McCormack had signed a 12-month deal to continue his job as head coach of the Scotland team. Danny Brough will continue to skipper the team into the World Cup, providing he stays fit. Except for Edinburgh Eagles stand-off Paddy Couper, all of the Scottish team's players were selected under the grandparent rule. In the group stage they made history as they finally won a game and it was against Fiji who were demolishing opponents courtesy of superstars such as Jarryd Hayne. But that is as far as they finished in the 2008 Rugby League World Cup because their points differential was worse than Fiji's and France who were also in their group and were demolished by them in their first game of the 2008 campaign. Several NRL and Super League stars were in McCormack's team for the tournament including Manly-Warringah Sea Eagles winger/fullback Michael Robertson who had scored 3 tries in Manly's 40–0 triumph over the Melbourne Storm in the 2008 NRL Grand Final just prior to the tournament as well as crossing for 18 tries in the 2008 NRL season.

=== 2010s ===
==== 2013 World Cup ====
No Qualification was required for the Bravehearts for the 2013 Rugby League World Cup due to participating in the 2008 tournament. They were drawn in pool C alongside World Cup debutantes Italy and the powerful forwards and fast backs of Tonga. Every team needed to play 3 group games each so Scotland would also play an inter-group game against the other World Cup debutantes the United States. The Scots were underdogs against the Pacific Island nation who were full of NRL talent. But Scotland, in front of a record crowd at Derwent Park made another upset (like Fiji five years ago) winning a tough match by only a two-point margin at the end of the match. Scotland's second match was against the Italians at the same venue in front of more than 7,000 fans again who this time witnessed a high scoring draw. Scotland then finished their group stage by beating the United States convincingly. Scotland had almost qualified for the World Cup knockout stage for the first ever time but Italy were still within a chance to finish above Scotland and therefore eliminate Scotland's chances from progressing any further in the 2013 tournament. Italy only needed to win after they were also on 16+ points differential and they were facing Tonga who had absolutely nothing at stake but pride to play for. But, a shock to all, Tonga outclassed the Italians and eliminated them from participating any further in the competition. In the quarter-final they had a rare clash with a rugby league heavyweight. They took on New Zealand in Leeds in front of their biggest attendance away from Scotland. Despite their early defensive pressure that the crowd loved to cheer out loud for, Scotland's lack of experience against the heavyweight nations showed on the scoreboard and were therefore eliminated in a pleasing World Cup performance.

==== 2010s European Cup ====
In 2010 the European Cup reverted to the 'League Leaders' being the winners rather than having final games like the 2000s decade. In the 2010 European Cup and 2012 European Cup competitions Scotland only managed to finish third in each tournament recording with only one total victory.

In October and November 2014, 2013 Super League Man of Steel Award winner and RLIF International Player of the Year shortlist award finalist Danny Brough led Scotland in the 2014 European Cup. He shared his belief saying that Scotland have the quality and deserve playing at a higher International level after the 2013 Rugby League World Cup performance. The Winner of the tournament would qualify to play in the 2016 Four Nations alongside International heavyweights Australia, England and New Zealand. Brough played at his best throughout the tournament, earning him the 'Player of the Tournament' award. His performances and leadership inspired and influenced the team to qualify for 2016's major international rugby league competition.

==== 2016 Four Nations ====
Scotland qualified for the 2016 Four Nations series and would be co hosts with England.

==== 2017 World Cup ====
After making the finals of the 2013 tournament, Scotland automatically qualified for the 2017 Rugby League World Cup.

=== 2021 World Cup ===
After losing to Italy in the opening group stage match at the tournament 28-4, Scotland suffered their worst ever defeat as a rugby league nation losing 84-0 to Australia in the second group stage game at Coventry. In the final group stage match, Scotland were defeated by Fiji 30-14 which meant they exited the competition winless.

=== 2026 World Cup ===
In 2024, it was announced that Scotland would be denied entry to the 2026 World Cup after having their membership status dropped to ‘affiliate’ level, along with three other nations.

== Identity ==
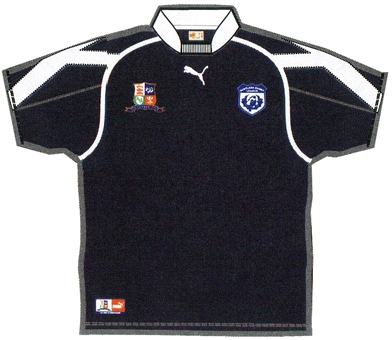
This shirt was used for the two World Cup Qualifying matches against Wales.

Since their first match Scotland have always played in royal blue, with a royal blue shirt, shorts and socks. In their two World Cup qualifying matches in 2007, the Scottish flag, featuring the white cross on a blue background, was on each shoulder and also on the shirt was a white collar. On the left of the shirt is the Scotland badge, and on the right is the Great Britain badge which is split into four and then has the England, Scotland, Wales and Ireland rugby league badges in a shield. This is to signify Scotland's part in the Great Britain setup.

In early 2008 Scotland Rugby League announced that they had secured a five-figure sponsorship deal with The Co-operative which would see the world's largest consumer-owned businesses logo on the front of the shirts for the 2008 World Cup and for all 2009 matches too.

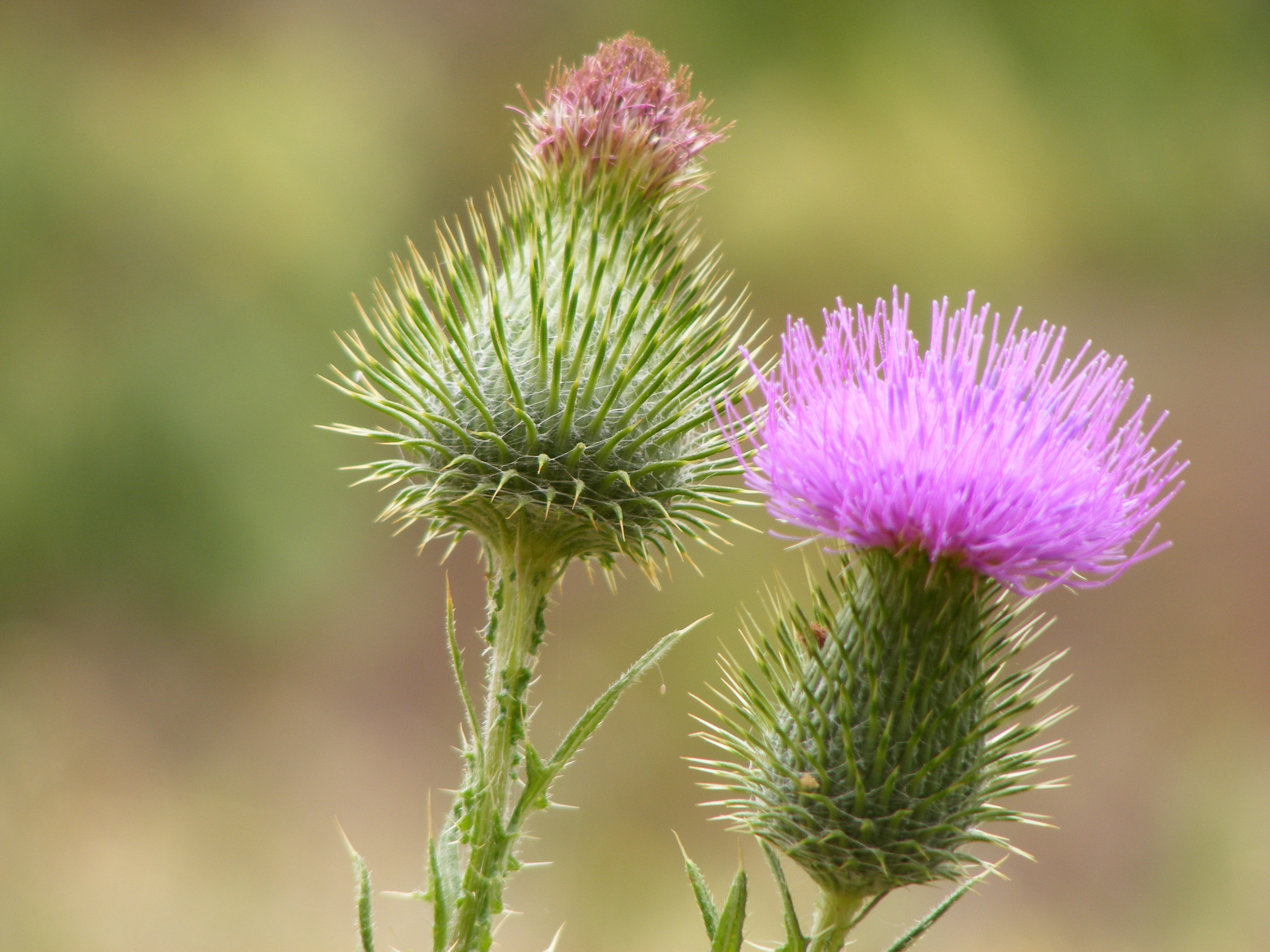
The Scotch thistle, open and closed.

A new shirt has recently been designed for the World Cup and it is expected that fans will be able to buy it sometime in the Summer 2008. Instead of the Great Britain badge on the right, there will be the World Cup logo, similar to each of the ten teams shirts. The shirt is made by German sportswear company Puma.

Scotland's current kit suppliers are BLK. On the shirt, Bartercard is on the front (replacing Highland Spring as of 2017) while Match Point is on the right sleeve while on the back, Caledonian Brewery is on the top while Lucozade Sport is on the bottom.

=== Emblem ===
The emblem of the Scotland team is the thistle, which is on the team's badge in a crest. The thistle is an ancient Celtic symbol of nobility of character as well as of birth and is the symbol of the Order of the Thistle a high chivalric order of Scotland. There is also a well-known Scottish legend that in Medieval times a Viking, wanting to invade Scotland, stood on a thistle and suddenly yelped in pain, alerting the defenders of a Scottish castle. The thistle is used on the badges of many national and domestic sports teams.

== Coaches ==
Name	Tenure	Matches	Won	Drew	Lost	Win %
(Scotland) George Fairbairn	1995-1997	6	3	0	3	50%
(Scotland) Billy McGinty	1998-1998	2	0	0	2	0%
(Australia) Shaun McRae	1999-2000	5	1	0	4	20%
(Scotland) Billy McGinty	2001-2003	3	2	0	1	66%
(England) Steve McCormack	2004-2017	35	12	2	21	34.3%
(Scotland) John Duffy (England) Chris Chester	2018 – 2018	3	0	0	3	0%
(Scotland) Nathan Graham	2019 – Present	3	2	1	0	66.7%

== Players ==
=== Current squad ===
Squad selected for the 2026 Rugby League Las Vegas vs USA :

- 1.Pete Burns (fullback)
- 2.Brett Carter (wing)
- 3.Andrew Brown (centre)
- 4.Jacob Grierson (centre)
- 5.Max Anderson-Moore (wing)
- 6.Lewis Clarke (five eighth)
- 7.Luke Punton (halfback)
- 8.Connor Terrill (prop)
- 9.Ross Whitmore (hooker)
- 10.Ben Morris (prop)
- 11.George Shannon (second row)
- 12.Dan Turland (second row)
- 13.Kieran Moran (lock)

Interchange

- 14.Jordan Duncan
- 15.Joe Kirkup
- 16.Niall Hall
- 17.Tom Murray

Reserves

- 18.Corrie Dicks

== Records ==
- **Bold** – denotes player still active at club level

=== Most capped players ===
#	Name	Career	Caps	Tries	Position
1	Danny Brough	2004–2017	24	4	Stand-off
2	Andrew Henderson	2003–2013	22	4	Hooker
2	Dale Ferguson	2010–	22	6	Prop
2	Ben Hellewell	2011–	22	8	Second-row
3	Ben Kavanagh	2013–	21	6	Prop

=== Top try scorers ===
#	Name	Career	Tries	Caps	Position
1	Mick Nanyn	2005–2009	9	10	Centre
2	Danny Arnold	1998–2003	8	9	Wing
3	Ben Fisher	2005–2013	6	15	Hooker
4	Matty Russell	2013–	5	7	Wing
5	Danny Brough	2004–	4	22	Stand-off

=== Player of the Year ===
Since 2004, the Scottish management team have given the Dave Valentine Award to their player of the year. The award uses a voting system and is given to the player in early January.

Year	Player	Club
2004	Chris Birchall	Halifax
2005	Jon Steel	Hull Kingston Rovers
2006	Neil Lowe	Doncaster
2007	Duncan MacGillivray	Wakefield Trinity
2008	Iain Morrison	Widnes Vikings
2009	Mick Nanyn	Leigh Centurions
2010	Dale Ferguson	Wakefield Trinity
2011	John Duffy	Leigh Centurions
2012	Ben Fisher	Catalans Dragons
2013	Luke Douglas	Gold Coast Titans
2014	Danny Brough	Huddersfield Giants
2015	David Scott	Doncaster
2016	Adam Walker	St Helens
2017	Danny Addy	Hull Kingston Rovers
2018	James Bell	New Zealand Warriors
2019	Callum McLelland	Leeds Rhinos

=== Team ===
- Highest winning score: 104–0 v Italy at Padova, 17 October 2009
- Widest winning margin: 104–0 v Italy at Padova, 17 October 2009
- Highest losing score: 84–0 v Australia at Coventry, 22 October 2022
- Widest losing margin: 84–0 v Australia at Coventry, 22 October 2022

=== Other ===
- Biggest home attendance: 2,233 vs France at Glasgow, 9 July 1997
- Biggest away attendance: 21,009 vs England at Coventry, 5 November 2016

== Competitive record ==
Since their inception as a rugby league nation, Scotland have played 60 matches, winning approximately 30%. Their most regular opponent has been Ireland, who similarly starting playing rugby league in the mid-1990s. In 1995, the Great Britain team split into the separate home nations. As such Scotland only started playing rugby league as an individual nation at this time. They played their first ever international against Ireland at the RDS Arena in Dublin in 1995. The Irish won by a close score of 26–22 in front of 5,716 fans. Scotland have gone on to play Ireland the most times with 15 matches, winning only four of these.

Scotland have played France and Wales 11 and 10 times respectively. Along with Ireland, these are the only teams that Scotland play on a regular basis. Despite playing these home nations a number of times, they have only played England on one occasion, although they have also played England's 2nd team, 'the Knights', twice. Excluding the aforementioned teams, Scotland have played 16 other teams in their history, but have not played more than three games against any of them. Scotland have a 100% win record against six of these 16 teams. In their history, they have drawn four games, including a 30–30 result against Italy during the 2013 Rugby League World Cup, having previously beaten them in by a resounding score of 104–0. Scotland's 18-18 result against New Zealand during the 2016 Four Nations was considered one of the greatest results in international rugby league history and ensured that Scotland became the only 'fourth' nation in Four Nations history to not be defeated by another team.

Scotland's highest home attendance is just 2,233. This game was only their second and saw them defeated 22–20 by France at Firhill Park, Glasgow. Rugby league is not a major sport in Scotland and home attendances average at around just 1,000. Scotland's highest away attendance was much more when a crowd of 21,009 saw them defeated by 38–12 against England during the 2016 Four Nations, this game being held at Ricoh Arena, Coventry.
Head to head record for the Scotland national side as of 24 October 2026.

Against	Played	Won	Drawn	Lost	Pts for	Pts against	Pts diff	% Won
Australia	2	0	0	2	12	138	–126	0%
Canada	1	1	0	0	22	10	+13	100%
Cook Islands	1	0	0	1	10	21	–11	100%
Cumbria Select XIII	1	1	0	0	48	16	+32	100%
England	1	0	0	1	12	38	–26	100%
England Knights	2	0	0	2	28	90	–62	100%
Fiji	2	1	0	1	42	46	–4	50%
France	11	2	0	9	198	326	–128	18.18%
Greece	1	1	0	0	42	24	+18	100%
Ireland	16	4	0	12	273	381	–108	25%
Italy	3	1	1	1	138	58	+80	33.33%
Jamaica	1	0	1	0	30	30	0	0%
Lebanon	1	1	0	0	22	10	+12	100%
Netherlands	1	0	0	1	26	34	–8	100%
Māori	1	0	0	1	16	17	–1	100%
New Zealand	3	0	1	2	28	132	–104	0%
Papua New Guinea	1	0	0	1	20	38	–18	100%
Russia	1	1	0	0	34	9	+25	100%
Samoa	2	0	1	1	26	34	–8	0%
Serbia	1	1	0	0	86	0	+86	100%
Tonga	3	1	0	2	30	122	–92	33.33%
United States	3	2	0	1	80	52	+28	66.67%
Wales	11	4	0	7	221	304	-83	26.67%
Total	70	21	4	45	1,434	1,930	–496	30%

=== World Cup ===
Scotland made their World Cup debut at the 2000 World Cup having previously competed as part of Great Britain. Their best result was in 2013 when they reached the Quarter Finals.

World Cup Record
Year	Round	Position	Pld
(France) 1954	Competed as (United Kingdom) Great Britain		
(Australia) 1957	Competed as (United Kingdom) Great Britain		
(England) 1960	Competed as (United Kingdom) Great Britain		
(Australia) (New Zealand) 1968	Competed as (United Kingdom) Great Britain		
(England) 1970	Competed as (United Kingdom) Great Britain		
(France) 1972	Competed as (United Kingdom) Great Britain		
1975	Competed as (United Kingdom) Great Britain		
(Australia) (New Zealand) 1977	Competed as (United Kingdom) Great Britain		
1985–1988	Competed as (United Kingdom) Great Britain		
1989–1992	Competed as (United Kingdom) Great Britain		
(England) 1995	Competed as (United Kingdom) Great Britain		
(England) (Ireland) (France) (Scotland) (Wales) 2000	Group Stage	13th out of 16	3
(Australia) 2008	Group Stage	6th out of 10	4
(England) (Wales) 2013	Quarter-final	7th out of 14	4
(Australia) (New Zealand) (Papua New Guinea) 2017	Group Stage	11th out of 14	3
(England) 2021	Group Stage	14th out of 16	3

=== European Championship ===
European Championship record							
Year**	Division	Round	Pos	Pld	W	D	L
2003	A	Group Stage	3rd	2	1	0	1
2004	A	Group Stage	3rd	2	1	0	1
2005	A	Group Stage	6th	2	0	0	2
2009	A	Runners Up	2nd	3	2	0	1
2010	A	Third Place	3rd	3	1	0	2
2012	A	Third Place	3rd	2	0	0	2
2014	A	Champions	1st	3	2	0	1
2015	A	Fourth Place	4th	3	0	0	3
2018	A	Fourth Place	4th	3	0	0	3
2023	A			0	0	0	0
Total	—	1 Championship	—	23	7	0	16
Champions Runners-up Promoted Relegated

=== Four Nations ===
Scotland have only qualified for one Four Nations tournament where they made history by becoming the first fourth nation to earn a point after an 18–18 draw against New Zealand.

Four Nations Record
Year	Round	Position	Pld	W	L	D
(England) (France) 2009	did not qualify					
(Australia) (New Zealand) 2010	did not enter					
(England) (Wales) 2011	did not qualify					
(Australia) (New Zealand) 2014	did not enter					
(England) 2016	Fourth Place	4/4	3	0	2	1

== IRL Rankings ==
IRL Men's World Rankings
Official rankings as of August 2026
Rank	Change	Team	Pts %
1	Steady	Australia	100
2	Steady	New Zealand	82
3	Steady	Tonga	70
4	Steady	Samoa	56
5	Steady	England	54
6	Steady	Papua New Guinea	47
7	Steady	Fiji	34
8	▲1	Cook Islands	24
9	▲2	Netherlands	23
10	▲2	Ukraine	21
11	▼3	France	21
12	▼2	Serbia	20
13	Steady	Wales	18
14	Steady	Ireland	17
15	Steady	Greece	14
16	Steady	Malta	14
17	▲12	Canada	13
18	▼1	Italy	11
19	▼1	Jamaica	9
20	▲7	Scotland	8
21	▲1	United States	8
22	▼3	Poland	7
23	▼3	Lebanon	7
24	▼1	Germany	7
25	▼1	Czech Republic	6
26	▼5	Norway	6
27	▼2	Chile	5
28	▲2	Philippines	5
29	▼1	South Africa	4
30	Steady	Brazil	3
31	Steady	Morocco	3
32	▲1	Argentina	3
33	▲2	Ghana	2
34	▲2	Kenya	2
35	▼1	Montenegro	2
36	▲1	Nigeria	2
37	▼5	North Macedonia	1
38	Steady	Albania	1
39	Steady	Turkey	1
40	Steady	Bulgaria	1
41	Steady	Cameroon	0
42	Steady	Japan	0
43	Steady	Spain	0
44	Steady	Colombia	0
45	Steady	Russia	0
46	Steady	El Salvador	0
47	Steady	Bosnia and Herzegovina	0
48	Steady	Hong Kong	0
49	Steady	Solomon Islands	0
50	Steady	Vanuatu	0
51	Steady	Hungary	0
52	Steady	Latvia	0
53	Steady	Denmark	0
54	Steady	Belgium	0
55	Steady	Estonia	0
56	Steady	Sweden	0
57	Steady	Niue	0
Complete rankings at www.internationalrugbyleague.com

== Other Scottish teams ==
The Scotland A national rugby league team is made up of amateur players, who either play in the Rugby League Conference the BUCS university league or the Scottish domestic competition. Napier University has also played a huge part in the team, with many Napier students having played in the side over the years. The team regularly compete against England, Wales and Ireland, playing them annually in the Rugby League Amateur Four Nations. Since the creation of this tournament, in 2002, Scotland have won it just once in 2010. In 2003 Scotland embarked on a mini tour of Europe playing in Netherlands, Italy and Serbia, helping expand rugby league in those country by playing domestic and national sides. Former player and winner in 2010 Mike Wallace currently coaches the side.

== See also ==
- Rugby league in Scotland
- Sport in Scotland
- Rugby League World Cup
- Great Britain national rugby league team
- List of Scotland national rugby league team players
- Scotland national rugby union team
