= Rugby league in Scotland =

- Country: Scotland
- Governing body: Scotland Rugby League
- National team: Scotland
- First played: 1909

National competitions
- Rugby League World Cup; Rugby League European Championship

Club competitions
- Scottish National League; National Youth League; Scottish Cup; Challenge Cup

Rugby league is a minor sport in Scotland, dwarfed by the popularity of association football and rugby union, and to a lesser extent curling, ice hockey and shinty.

== History ==
Rugby league in Scotland began in 1909, during the 1908–09 Kangaroo tour of Great Britain, with Australian team facing a Northern Rugby Football Union representative side at Celtic Park, Glasgow. This was the first rugby league game to be played in Scotland, and ended with a 17–17 draw. During the 1911–12 Kangaroo tour of Great Britain, Scotland held its second rugby league match at Tynecastle, Edinburgh, this time an Ashes game. Great Britain drew with Australia 11–11.

In 1954, Scotsman Dave Valentine captained Great Britain to victory in the inaugural edition of the Rugby League World Cup.

In 1989, a Scotland students side was formed at the University of Aberdeen, and this proved to be the catalyst for the formation of a number of other clubs.

In 1994, Scotland Rugby League was formed to serve as the national governing body for Scotland. A year later the Scottish national team was formed and a domestic league (the Scottish Conference) followed in 1997.

In 2000 and 2002 the Challenge Cup Final was held at Murrayfield in Edinburgh, the home of the Scottish Rugby Union, during the Redevelopment of Wembley Stadium. 2000 saw Bradford Bulls defeat Leeds Rhinos 24–18, and in 2002 Wigan Warriors beat St. Helens 21–12. The games attracted 67,247 and 62,140 which to date (June 2024) are the largest rugby league attendances in Scotland.

In 2007, the Scottish Conference was incorporated into the Rugby League Conference as the "RLC Scottish Premier" as part of an RFL attempt to formalise amateur rugby league across Great Britain which began in 1997. In 2012, the RLC Scottish Premier became the Scottish National League following a second restructure of amateur rugby league, and governance of the league returning to Scotland.

== Governing body ==
Scotland Rugby League is the governing body for rugby league in Scotland overseeing development and participation at all levels of the sport.

== Competitions ==
=== Senior ===
The Scottish National League is the highest tier exclusively Scottish rugby league competition and comprises four teams: Edinburgh Eagles, Forth Valley Vikings, Glasgow Rugby League, and West End Warriors. The league is governed by Scotland Rugby League. The league forms part of the British rugby league system. As of June 2024, no Scottish sides have played in the higher tiers of the pyramid, though some have featured in the Challenge Cup.

=== Junior ===
The Saltire Schools Cup is a nationwide Scottish schools competition for boys and girls from S1–S4 school age groups. The National Youth League is competed for at under-17 and under-15 level.

== National teams ==
=== Men ===
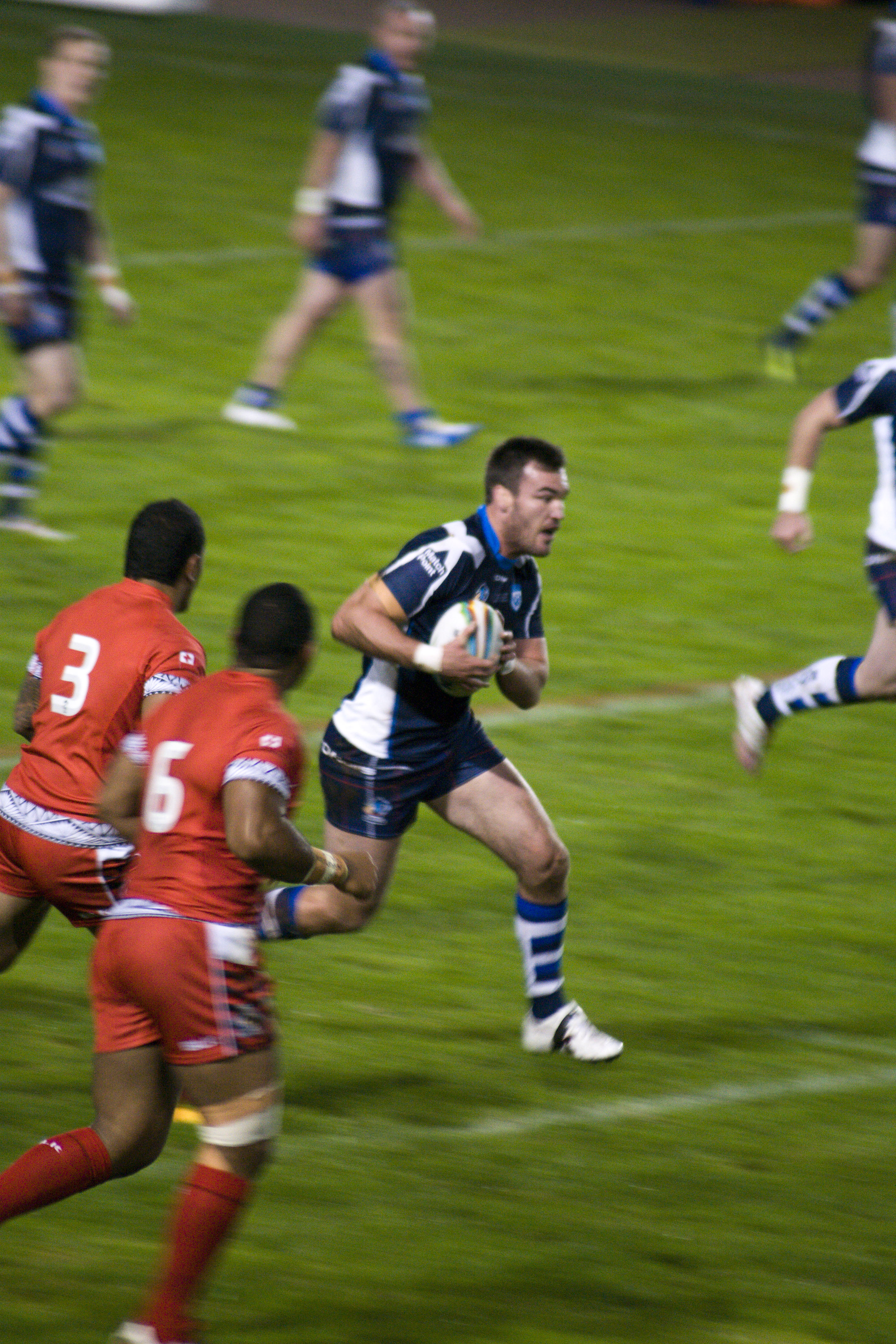
Scotland vs Tonga at the 2013 Rugby League World Cup

There are two Scottish teams selected: Scotland and Scotland A. The Scotland team is predominantly second-generation professional players, born and bred in England, whereas the Scotland A team (nicknamed "the Bravehearts") is an amateur side selected from the domestic Scottish competition.

Scotland has participated in the Emerging Nations Cup (1995), in every World Cup since 2000, and European Nations Cup (since 2003) competitions.

Since 2002, Scotland A has participated in the Amateur Four Nations competition and toured Italy, the Netherlands, and Serbia.

=== Women ===
Scotland women's national rugby league team was formed in 2025. Their first train-on squad was announced in April 2025 along with plans for their initial matches, later confirmed to be against Wales in August and a tri-series with Jamaica and England Community Lions beginning in October. On 3 August 2025, Scotland lost 18–12 to Wales in their first match.

=== Wheelchair ===
In 2012, the Scotland national wheelchair rugby league team took part in a Four Nations competition with England, Ireland and Wales. The following year they competed at the 2013 World Cup. In 2015, Scotland played in the inaugural Celtic Cup against Ireland. This annual competition became a three-team event when Wales joined the following year. Scotland also competed at the 2017 and 2021 World Cup tournaments.

== Popularity ==
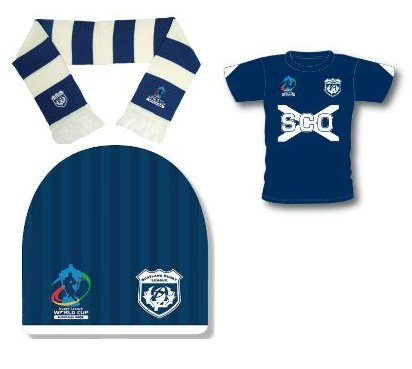
World Cup merchandise for fans.

Rugby League is a minor sport in Scotland, with the country never having had a professional club. Participation in rugby league has increased though, with a Scottish division in the Rugby League Conference with seven teams, including four in the Glasgow/West Scotland area having formed in 2006. But, unlike in England, rugby league is not one of the ten most played sports in Scotland amongst adults. Junior development has been much more rapid, with several Conference teams having junior squads as well as other clubs who don't run an open-age squad having various junior squads. An estimated 2,500 children play rugby league in Scotland, with that figure growing to 12,500 when you add the number of children who play the sport in various school programmes. In terms of media coverage, apart from Challenge Cup matches rugby league is not shown on Scottish terrestrial television and no matches are usually broadcast on radio. However, Scotland international matches usually get reported in national newspapers like The Scotsman and sometimes in Scottish editions of London-based newspapers.

In 2009, the Magic Weekend was held at Murrayfield with a two-day attendance of 60,000 spectators, including ticket sales of just under 7,000 in Scotland alone, making the event a success.

== Media ==
There are two weekly rugby league newspapers, Rugby Leaguer & League Express and League Weekly, and two monthly magazines, Rugby League World and Thirteen Magazine. These cover the sport worldwide and across the UK. These publications are usually only available by subscription in Scotland.

BBC Sport own the rights to broadcast a highlights package called the Super League Show which was first broadcast in Scotland in 2008. Prior to this it had only been broadcast in the North of England. Rugby League Raw is not broadcast in Scotland despite the BBC owning the rights to do so. The BBC covers the Rugby League Challenge Cup from the rounds in which the top clubs enter.

BBC Radio 5 Live and BBC Radio 5 Sports Extra carry commentary from a selection of Super League matches each week.

Live Super League and National Rugby League games are shown on Sky Sports Arena with highlights also being shown on the channel. From the 2022 season, 10 live Super League games per season will be shown on Channel 4, the first time the league will be shown on terrestrial television. Championship games are shown on Premier Sports, with one game a week being aird.

== See also ==
- Sport in Scotland
- Rugby league in the British Isles
