= Scunthorpe Barbarians =

Club information
- Full name: Scunthorpe Barbarians Rugby League Football Club
- Colours: Black shirts with white shoulders and underarm panels, black shorts
- Founded: 2006 as Scunthorpe Braves, 2007 as Scunthorpe Barbarians
- Website: scunthorperlfc.co.uk

Current details
- Ground: Heslam Park / John Leggott College, Scunthorpe
- Competition: Rugby League Conference

Scunthorpe Barbarians are a rugby league team based in Scunthorpe, North Lincolnshire. They play in the Yorkshire Regional Division of the Rugby League Conference.

== History ==
Scunthorpe Braves were formed in 2006. The Braves joined the Midlands Merit League, playing competitive fixtures all over Yorkshire and North East Lincolnshire, finally finishing 4th out of six teams in the league.

The 2007 season saw the club reform as Scunthorpe Barbarians, join forces with Scunthorpe RUFC, operate out of Heslam Park and join the Yorkshire and Lincolnshire Division of the Rugby League Conference. After winning the first game of the season against Rossington Sharks, it became a bit of a struggle for a win, with the elusive second win being picked up against Scarborough Pirates after the Barbarians were closely beaten by Lincoln City Knights. The club finished the season in 7th position out of 8, after winning two and drawing one of their twelve games.

The 2008 season, once again saw the Barbarians play in the Rugby League Conference, with their division being reconstituted as the South Yorkshire and Lincolnshire Division, with the furthest distance to travel being to Sheffield Forgers. There were victories against Sheffield Forgers and Rossington Sharks at Ashby, with the only away success of the season being at Rotherham Giants. An A-team was also entered into the RL Merit League.

The 2009 season saw the Barbarians finally break through in the Rugby League Conference, losing only two games in the South Yorkshire and Lincolnshire division, these being to Parkside Hawks and Lincoln City Knights, drawing one, and winning seven on their way to qualifying for the end of season playoffs. This however was as far as their season went, as they were defeated in the first round of the playoffs by Rotherham Giants.

2010 sees the Barbarians playing in the Yorkshire Regional Division of the RLC, with themselves, Leeds Akkies and Lincoln City Knights being the longest serving clubs in this division. New teams representing Wetherby, Bradford Victoria, Shaw Cross and Barnsley coming into the division alongside them. The end of May 2010 saw the Barbarians move to a new playing facility at John Leggott College, and were successful in their first ever fixture there, defeating Lincolnshire rivals Lincoln City Knights 36-34 through a last minute Will Scupham try. Scunthorpe Barbarians failed to complete the season in the Yorkshire Regional division.

== Playing Records ==
[Correct as at Start of 2010 season]

Biggest Victory

As Scunthorpe Braves - 104-6 vs Chesterfield Spires RLFC – MML – 3 June 2006

As Scunthorpe Barbarians - 90-0 vs Leeds Akkies ‘A’ – RLC 13 June 2009

Biggest Defeat 106-0 vs Moorends-Thorne Marauders RLFC – 24 May 2008

Most Tries in a Game Lewis Jones – 5 vs Leeds Akkies ‘A’ – 13 June 2009

Most Goals in a Game Tom Alldridge – 14. 3 June 2006

Most Points in a Game Tom Alldridge – 28 (14 goals), vs Chesterfield Spires, 3 June 2006

Karl Clayton – 28 (8 goals, 3 tries), vs Leeds Akkies ‘A’, 13 June 2009

Most Tries in a Season Lewis Jones – 11 – 2007 season.

Most Career Goals Tom Alldridge – 68

Most Career Tries Lewis Jones – 23

Most Conversions In a Season - 42
