= Telford Raiders =

English rugby league club, based in Telford, Shropshire

Club information
- Full name: Telford Raiders ARLFC
- Colours: Blue and Yellow
- Founded: 2003; 23 years ago
- Website: https://telford-raiders.com/

Current details
- Ground: Phoenix Sports and Leisure Centre, Duce Drive, Dawley, TF4 2EX
- Competition: Rugby League Conference Midlands Regional

Telford Raiders ARLFC are a rugby league club based in the town of Telford in Shropshire, England. Their first team plays in the Midlands Regional division of the Rugby League Conference and they have a development team in the Midlands Rugby League as well as an active junior development program.

== History of rugby league in Telford ==
Rugby league has been played in the Telford area for many years with varying degrees of success. The Telford All Blacks played for several years in the North West Counties leagues at both senior and youth levels but for a number of reasons they became unable to continue and folded.

In the early 1990s Dave and Janet Berry moved to Telford from Hull and over a number of years built up the Randlay Raiders youth team, which in turn inspired the formation of other boys teams, and a Shropshire league was formed. At its peak the Shropshire league had more than 150 registered youth players, and the Randlay Raiders also travelled throughout the country to play. However the pressures of running a league like this in a non-heartland area were too great and the league folded.

However the enthusiasm, as well as the awareness generated over the years, remained and in the autumn of 2002 the committee of the Raiders club applied to enter an open-age team in the Rugby League Conference to play under the name of Telford Raiders. Their acceptance into a national competition was a significant step forward for rugby league in the town.

In 2005 the Raiders stepped up to the Premier Central division of the Conference where they came up against teams from heartlands areas such as Leeds, Dewsbury and Hull. This was a hard season in terms of travelling and in terms of the standard of rugby. In 2006 other Midlands teams joined the renamed Midlands Premier division and this meant much less travelling and a more competitive season.

In 2006 a second club was formed in Telford: Telford Trojans. They competed in the Midland Merit League in 2006 then moved to nearby Shifnal in 2007 as Shropshire Scorpions but folded at the end of that season. 2006 was also a good year for the Raiders, finishing 5th in the Midlands Premier Division with good wins over local rivals Wolverhampton Wizards and two very close games against the Birmingham Bulldogs. Junior players also had the opportunity to take part in four junior festivals, including the Raiders own, which were highly successful.

2007 was another promising year for the Raiders with numerous junior festivals across the Midlands and a Midlands Junior League. The senior team again competed in the Midlands Premier Division of the Rugby League Conference. The Raiders under-15 won the first ever Midlands Junior League match, beating the Sheffield Forgers by 55 points to 20. The under-15 team went on to become the first winners of this competition. 2007 also saw the Raiders appear in a feature about rugby league in Telford on the Sky Sports program Boots 'n' All.

2008 saw Telford competing in the West Midlands regional division, finishing a creditable 3rd. They also fielded an 'A' team in the Merit League plus junior teams at under-16, under-14 and under-12.

In 2009 Telford Raiders dropped out of the Midlands Premier Division with 3 games to go, and changed grounds when the Oakengates facility became unavailable. Both the under-16s and under-12s teams reached the finals of the Midlands Junior League, but were beaten by Nottingham Outlaws and Northampton Knights respectively.

In 2010, Telford linked up with Super League side St Helens R.F.C.

2012 saw the Junior U12’s win the North West Development Cup beating Ince Rose Bridge in the final.

The same junior squad competed and Won the North West junior league in 2017 becoming NW Under 17’s champions with Head coach Martin Foskett becoming NW U17’s Coach of the year.

== Women's team ==
In 2023, the Telford Raiders women's team competed in the newly launched Women's Super League Midlands at the second tier of the national pyramid. Telford defeated Coventry Bears 38–14 in the Grand Final to win the competition. In 2024, the league was renamed as the Midlands Championship (one of three regional competitions of the RFL Women's Championship). In the 2025 and 2026 seasons, Telford won the Midlands Championship by defeating Leamington Royals in the final on both occasions.

== Club honours ==
=== Men ===
- RLC Midlands Division: 2011
- Midlands Rugby League Division One: 2012
- Midlands Rugby League Premier Division: 2013, 2018, 2023, 2024, 2025
- Harry Jepson cup winners: 2024

=== Women ===
- Women's Super League Midlands: 2023
- Women's Midlands Championship: 2025, 2026

=== Junior ===
- North West U12's Development Cup Winners: 2012
- North West U17's Premier Division Champions: 2017

== Juniors ==
Telford Raiders' junior teams take part in the Midlands Junior League.

== Honours ==
- Daz White (England Lionhearts)
- Matt Evans (England Lionhearts)
- Richard Whitehouse (England Lionhearts)
- Jim Berry (RLC Young Player of the Year 2004)
- Paul Szehofner (Germany RL)
- Ricky Bailey (became the club's first Super League player in 2015)

== Club records ==
- Biggest Win 67-16 vs Worcester Saints (H) 2004
- Biggest Defeat 6 - 68 vs Birmingham Bulldogs (A) 2003
- Personal Try Tally 14 by Uluaki (Rocky) Kale in 2025 Season
- Personal Goal Tally 35 by Daz White in 2004 Season
- Personal Drop Goal Tally 2 by Daz White in 2004 Season
