= Leamington Royals =

English rugby league team

- Lion

Club information
- Full name: Leamington Royals Rugby League
- Colours: Royal blue, pink & gold
- Founded: 2009

Current details
- Ground: Acre Close, Whitnash, Leamington Spa, Warwickshire CV31 2ND
- Competition: Midlands Rugby League Premier Division

Leamington Royals are a rugby league team based in Royal Leamington Spa, Warwickshire, England. They play in the Midlands Rugby League Division Two.

== History ==
Leamington Royals were formed in 2009. The club were accepted into the Midlands Rugby League for the 2009 season. The first ever league fixture was played on 10 May 2009 against Birmingham Bulldogs with Birmingham winning 42 - 32. The Royals recorded their first victory Four weeks later against Leicester Phoenix. The club went on to play a further seven fixtures in 2009 finishing 3rd overall and reached the play-off semi-finals.

In 2010, the club moved up a league into the Rugby League Conference Midlands regional division. The Royals' 10 wins from 12 games saw the club finish top of the division and into the Midlands Grand final against Telford Raiders. Leamington beat Telford in the final held at the Crofts and topped off the season by being crowned Warwick District Council 'Team of the Year' in its annual sports awards.

This season (2013) saw the move from Old Leamingtonians Rugby Union Club to the Royals' new home at Acre Close in Whitnash, in a partnership with Whitnash Sports & Social Club (www.whitnashssc.co.uk). Rhys Horton has been given the honour of captaining the side in only his second season playing rugby league.

== Women's team ==
In 2023, the Leamington Royals Ladies were the first midlands side to take part in the RFL Women's Nines tournament where they recorded a 23-0 win over Oldham in the group stages. They were also one of the four teams to compete in the inaugural season of the Women's Super League Midlands, which became the Midlands Championship in 2024.

== Juniors ==
Leamington Royals' juniors take part in the Midlands Junior League.

== Club Honours ==
- RLC Midlands Regional Champions: 2010
- RLC Midlands Rugby League Division 2 Champions: 2013
- Kukri Midlands Rugby League Semi-Finalists: 2009
- Warwick District Team of the Year 2010
