= Sheffield Rugby Clubs =

There are many rugby clubs in Sheffield.

== Rugby league ==
- Sheffield Eagles - in National League 1
- Sheffield Forgers
- Sheffield Hillsborough Hawks

== Rugby union ==
- Sheffield Abbeydale RUFC
- Sheffield Hallamshire RUFC
- Sheffield Oaks RUFC
- Sheffield Tigers RUFC
