= 2015–16 RFU Championship =

- Countries: England; Jersey
- Date: 4 September 2015 – May 2016
- Champions: Bristol
- Runners-up: Doncaster Knights
- Relegated: Moseley
- Matches played: 138
- Attendance: 298,010 (average 2,159 per match)
- Highest attendance: 16,084 Bristol Rugby v Doncaster Knights on 25 May 2016
- Lowest attendance: 310 Ealing Trailfinders v Nottingham Rugby on 28 November 2015
- Tries scored: 848 (average 6.1 per match)
- Top point scorer: (Wales) Gavin Henson; Bristol 193 points
- Top try scorer: (New Zealand) Paul Grant; Nottingham Rugby 19 tries

The 2015–16 RFU Championship, known for sponsorship reasons as the Greene King IPA Championship, is the seventh season of the professionalised format of the RFU Championship, the second tier of the English rugby union league system run by the Rugby Football Union. It is contested by eleven English clubs and one from Jersey in the Channel Islands. This is the third year of the competition's sponsorship with Greene King Brewery, which runs until 2017. The twelve teams in the RFU Championship also compete in the British and Irish Cup, along with clubs from Ireland and Wales. Some matches in the RFU Championship are broadcast on Sky Sports.

Moseley are relegated into the 2016–17 National League 1 after finishing bottom of the table. After seven years of trying for promotion (five of which they actually topped the league stage including during this season), Bristol finally did it. In front of a divisional and club record crowd of 16,084, Bristol managed to gain promotion to the Aviva Premiership despite losing 32–34 to away side (and league stage runners up), Doncaster Knights, due to an emphatic first leg victory, to go up 60 - 47 on aggregate.

== Structure ==
The Championship's structure has all the teams playing each other on a home and away basis. The play-off structure will remain the same as the previous year. The top four teams at the end of the home-and-way season qualify for the promotion play-offs which follow a 1 v 4, 2 v 3 system. The winners have to meet the RFU's Minimum Standards Criteria in order to be promoted to the Premiership. There is no promotion if grounds fail to meet the criteria. There are no relegation play-offs; the bottom team is automatically relegated. This the last year of a 2012 funding agreement with the RFU, where each club would have been given a grant of £380,000. Following claims, by Championship teams, including Plymouth Albion, that the current arrangement was not enough to sustain professional clubs, the RFU increased the annual funding to over £500,000 per club in a new agreement which will last until 2020.

== Teams ==
Locations of the 2015–16 RFU Championship teams
Greater London RFU Championship teams clubs

Ten of the teams, listed below, played in the championship last season. Worcester Warriors were promoted to the English Premiership defeating Bristol in the 2014–15 RFU Championship play-off final and are replaced by London Welsh, following their relegation from the 2014–15 English Premiership, after finishing bottom of the table and earning only one point. Plymouth Albion were relegated from the Championship after finishing bottom in the 2014–15 RFU Championship, ending a thirteen-year spell in the second tier of English rugby. They are replaced by Ealing Trailfinders who were promoted as champions of 2014–15 National League 1, returning to the RFU Championship after relegation the previous year.

Club	Stadium	Capacity	Area	Captain	DOR/Head Coach
Bedford Blues	Goldington Road	5,000 (1,700 seats)	Bedford, Bedfordshire	(South Africa) Nick Fenton-Wells	(Wales) Mike Rayer
Bristol	Ashton Gate Stadium	16,600 (Note: Capacity at Ashton Gate was down from 21,497 to 16,600 due to redevelopment work to modernise the stadium up to 27,000 for the 2016–17 season.)	Bristol	(Wales) Dwayne Peel	(England) Andy Robinson
Cornish Pirates	Mennaye Field	4,000 (2,200 Seats)	Penzance, Cornwall	(England) Chris Morgan	(Wales) Ian Davies
Doncaster Knights	Castle Park rugby stadium	5,000	Doncaster, South Yorkshire	(England) Michael Hills	(Wales) Clive Griffiths
Ealing Trailfinders	Trailfinders Sports Ground	3,020 (1,020 seats)	West Ealing, London	(Ireland) Danny Kenny	(England) Ben Ward
Jersey	St Peter	5,000	Saint Peter, Jersey	(England) Alex Rae	(South Africa) Harvey Biljon
London Scottish	Athletic Ground, Richmond	4,500 (1,000 seats)	Richmond, London	(England) Mark Bright	(England) Mike Friday
London Welsh	Old Deer Park	5,850 (1,000 seats)	Richmond, London	(England) Matt Corker	(Wales) Rowland Phillips
Moseley	Billesley Common	3,000+	Birmingham, West Midlands	(Wales) Mike Powell	(Ireland) Kevin Maggs
Nottingham Rugby	Lady Bay Sports Ground	2,000 (est)	Nottingham, Nottinghamshire	(Australia) Daniel Montagu	(England) Martin Haag
Rotherham Titans	Clifton Lane; Herringthorpe Playing Fields	2,500; Unknown capacity	Rotherham, South Yorkshire	(England) Tom Holmes	(England) Lee Blackett
Yorkshire Carnegie	Headingley Carnegie Stadium	21,062	Leeds, West Yorkshire	(England) Ryan Burrows	(Scotland) Ian McGeechan

== Table ==
2015–16 RFU Championship table
Pos	Team	Pld	W	D	L	PF	PA	PD	TB	LB	Pts	Promotion or relegation
1	Bristol (C)	22	20	0	2	718	397	+321	14	1	95	Promotion play-off place
2	Doncaster Knights (F)	22	15	2	5	588	470	+118	10	5	79	Promotion play-off place
3	Yorkshire Carnegie (SF)	22	14	0	8	655	466	+189	15	7	78	Promotion play-off place
4	Bedford Blues (SF)	22	12	0	10	623	599	+24	10	6	64	Promotion play-off place
5	London Welsh	22	11	1	10	442	528	−86	9	3	58	
6	Jersey	22	11	1	10	465	466	−1	5	6	57	
7	Nottingham Rugby	22	10	0	12	494	483	+11	9	7	56	
8	London Scottish	22	10	0	12	463	453	+10	2	7	49	
9	Cornish Pirates	22	8	1	13	530	570	−40	8	7	49	
10	Rotherham Titans	22	8	0	14	454	621	−167	3	3	38	
11	Ealing Trailfinders	22	6	1	15	523	605	−82	5	6	37	
12	Moseley (R)	22	4	0	18	416	715	−299	6	4	26	Relegation place

Updated to match(es) played on 13 May 2016. Source: "Greene King IPA Championship". NCA Rugby.
Rules for classification: If teams are level at any stage, tiebreakers are applied in the following order:
1. Number of matches won
2. Difference between points for and against
3. Total number of points for
4. Aggregate number of points scored in matches between tied teams
5. Number of matches won excluding the first match, then the second and so on until the tie is settled

== Fixtures ==
=== Round 1 ===
4 September 2015
19:45

(BP) London Scottish	19 – 23	Moseley
	Scottish; Moseley

Athletic Ground
Attendance: 888
Referee: Darren Gamage

5 September 2015
14:30

(2BP) Doncaster Knights	33 – 35	London Welsh (BP)
	Welsh

Castle Park
Attendance: 1,019
Referee: Greg MacDonald

6 September 2015
14:00

Rotherham Titans	24 – 23	Ealing Trailfinders (BP)
	Rotherham; Ealing

Herringthorpe Playing Fields (Note: Rotherham Titans played at Herringthorpe Stadium due to the local cricket club using Clifton Road on the same date.)
Attendance: 887
Referee: Matthew O’Grady

6 September 2015
15:00

(BP) Bristol Rugby	23 – 29	Bedford Blues (BP)
	Bristol; Bedford

Ashton Gate
Attendance: 6,063
Referee: Tom Foley

6 September 2015
15:00

Cornish Pirates	18 – 14	Nottingham (BP)
	Pirates; Nottingham

The Mennaye
Attendance: 1,447
Referee: Craig Maxwell-Keys

6 September 2015
15:00

(BP) Yorkshire Carnegie	39 – 22	Jersey
	Carnegie; Jersey

Headingley
Attendance: 2,037
Referee: Andrew Jackson

=== Round 2 ===
12 September 2015
15:00

(BP) Bedford Blues	38 – 32	Moseley (2BP)
	Bedford; Moseley

Goldington Road
Attendance: 2,239
Referee: Simon Harding

12 September 2015
15:00

Ealing Trailfinders	17 – 37	London Scottish (BP)
	Ealing; Scottish

Trailfinders Sports Ground
Attendance: 744
Referee: Craig Maxwell-Keys

12 September 2015
15:00

Jersey	17 – 15	Cornish Pirates (BP)
	Jersey; Pirates

St Peter
Attendance: 2,146
Referee: Andrew Small

13 September 2015
14:00

Rotherham Titans	11 – 20	Yorkshire Carnegie
	Rotherham; Carnegie

Clifton Lane
Attendance: 1,437
Referee: Tim Wigglesworth

13 September 2015
15:00

(2BP) Nottingham Rugby	30 – 36	Doncaster Knights (BP)
	Nottingham

Lady Bay Sports Ground
Attendance: 794
Referee: Darren Gamage

13 September 2015
15:15

London Welsh	22 – 36	Bristol Rugby (BP)
	Welsh; Bristol

Old Deer Park
Attendance: 2,032
Referee: Greg Garner

=== Round 3 ===
19 September 2015
14:30

Doncaster Knights	31 – 27	Jersey (BP)
	Jersey

Castle Park
Attendance: 1,052
Referee: Tom Foley

19 September 2015
14:30

London Scottish	24 – 12	Bedford Blues
	Scottish; Bedford

Athletic Ground
Attendance: 1,154
Referee: Matt Carley

19 September 2015
15:00

Moseley	6 – 17	London Welsh
	Moseley; Welsh

Billesley Common
Attendance: 966
Referee: Tim Wigglesworth

20 September 2015
15:00

(BP) Bristol Rugby	46 – 31	Nottingham Rugby (BP)
	Bristol

Ashton Gate
Attendance: 5,544
Referee: Dean Richards

20 September 2015
15:00

(BP) Cornish Pirates	24 – 26	Rotherham Titans
	Pirates; Rotherham

Mennaye Field
Attendance: 1,274
Referee: Luke Pearce

20 September 2015
15:00

(BP) Yorkshire Carnegie	40 – 28	Ealing Trailfinders (BP)
	Carnegie; Ealing

Headingley
Attendance: 1,938
Referee: Greg MacDonald

=== Round 4 ===
26 September 2015
14:00

(BP) London Welsh	30 – 24	Bedford Blues (BP)
	Report

Old Deer Park
Attendance: 1,697
Referee: Darren Gamage

26 September 2015
15:00

Ealing Trailfinders	28 – 17	Cornish Pirates
	Report

Trailfinders Sports Ground
Attendance: 863
Referee: Simon Harding

26 September 2015
15:00

Jersey	7 – 24	Bristol Rugby
	Report

St Peter
Attendance: 2,053
Referee: Luke Pearce

26 September 2015
15:00

Rotherham Titans	30 – 23	Doncaster Knights (BP)
	Report

Clifton Lane
Attendance: 1,721
Referee: Andrew Jackson

26 September 2015
15:00

(2BP) Yorkshire Carnegie	27 – 30	London Scottish
	Report

Headingley
Attendance: 1,329
Referee: Steve Lee

27 September 2015
15:00

(BP) Nottingham Rugby	34 – 22	Moseley
	Report

Lady Bay Sports Ground
Attendance: 623
Referee: Greg MacDonald

=== Round 5 ===
3 October 2015
14:30

Doncaster Knights	23 – 17	Ealing Trailfinders (BP)
	Report

Castle Park
Attendance: 1,231
Referee: Steve Lee

3 October 2015
14:30

London Scottish	11 – 10	London Welsh (BP)
	Report

Athletic Ground
Attendance: 1,438
Referee: Andrew Small

3 October 2015
15:00

Bedford Blues	28 – 19	Nottingham
	Report

Goldington Road
Attendance: 2,101
Referee: Greg Garner

3 October 2015
15:00

Moseley	18 – 29	Jersey
	Report

Billesley Common
Attendance: 830
Referee: Matthew O'Grady

4 October 2015
15:00

(BP) Bristol Rugby	28 – 12	Rotherham Titans
	Report

Ashton Gate
Attendance: 4,560
Referee: Craig Maxwell Keys

4 October 2015
15:00

Cornish Pirates	13 – 26	Yorkshire Carnegie (BP)
	Report

Mennaye Field
Attendance: 1,184
Referee: Tom Foley

=== Round 6 ===
9 October 2015
19:45

Nottingham Rugby	30 – 10	London Welsh
	Report

Lady Bay Sports Ground
Attendance: 797
Referee: Luke Pearce

9 October 2015
20:00

Yorkshire Carnegie	27 – 20	Doncaster Knights (BP)
	Report

Headingley
Attendance: 2,373
Referee: Andrew Small

10 October 2015
14:45

(BP) Jersey	34 – 27	Bedford Blues (BP)
	Report

St Peter
Attendance: 2,010
Referee: Andrew Jackson

10 October 2015
15:00

(BP) Ealing Trailfinders	21 – 26	Bristol Rugby
	Report

Trailfinders Sports Ground
Attendance: 874
Referee: Ian Tempest

10 October 2015
15:00

(BP) Rotherham Titans	37 – 27	Moseley
	Report

Clifton Lane
Attendance: 1,132
Referee: Dean Richards

11 October 2015
15:00

Cornish Pirates	21 – 17	London Scottish (BP)
	Report

Mennaye Field
Attendance: 1,054
Referee: Greg Garner

=== Round 7 ===
16 October 2015
19:30

(BP) Moseley	38 – 25	Ealing Trailfinders
	Report

Billesley Common
Attendance: 975
Referee: Darren Gamage

16 October 2015
19:45

(BP) Bedford Blues	46 – 28	Rotherham Titans (BP)
	Report

Goldington Road
Attendance: 2,574
Referee: Simon Harding

16 October 2015
19:45

(BP) London Scottish	17 – 18	Nottingham Rugby
	Report

Athletic Ground
Attendance: 894
Referee: Matthew O'Grady

17 October 2015
14:00

(BP) Doncaster Knights	28 – 11	Cornish Pirates
	Report

Castle Park
Attendance: 1,219
Referee: Ian Tempest

17 October 2015
14:00

London Welsh	14 – 8	Jersey (BP)
	Report

Old Deer Park
Attendance: 842
Referee: Craig Maxwell-Keys

18 October 2015
13:30

(BP) Bristol Rugby	47 – 42	Yorkshire Carnegie (2BP)
	Report

Ashton Gate
Attendance: 5,185
Referee: Andrew Jackson

=== Round 8 ===
23 October 2015
19:45

(BP) Jersey	27 – 29	Nottingham Rugby (BP)
	Report

St Peter
Attendance: 2,016
Referee: Ian Tempest

24 October 2015
14:00

Cornish Pirates	10 – 40	Bristol Rugby (BP)
	Report

Mennaye Field
Attendance: 1,890
Referee: Darren Gamage

24 October 2015
14:00

Doncaster Knights	19 – 10	London Scottish
	Report

Castle Park
Attendance: 1,159
Referee: John Meredith

24 October 2015
14:00

(BP) Ealing Trailfinders	21 – 23	Bedford Blues
	Report

Trailfinders Sports Ground
Attendance: 748
Referee: Steve Lee

24 October 2015
14:00

Rotherham Titans	32 – 16	London Welsh
	Report

Clifton Lane
Attendance: 1,087
Referee: Andrew Jackson

25 October 2015
14:00

(BP) Yorkshire Carnegie	52 – 19	Moseley
	Report

Headingley
Attendance: 1,821
Referee: Tim Wigglesworth

=== Round 9 ===
6 November 2015
19:30

(BP) Moseley	24 – 19	Cornish Pirates (BP)
	Report

Billesely Common
Attendance: 1,145
Referee: Andrew Small

6 November 2015
19:45

Bristol Rugby	27 – 39	Doncaster Knights (BP)
	Report

Ashton Gate
Attendance: 6,979
Referee: Dean Richards

7 November 2015
14:00

London Scottish	5 – 20	Jersey
	Report

Athletic Ground
Attendance: 1,007
Referee: Steve Lee

7 November 2015
14:00

London Welsh	3 – 27	Ealing Trailfinders
	Report

Old Deer Park
Attendance: 803
Referee: Simon Harding

7 November 2015
15:00

Bedford Blues	22 – 21	Yorkshire Carnegie (BP)
	Report

Goldington Road
Attendance: 2,224
Referee: Matthew O'Grady

8 November 2015
15:00

(BP) Nottingham Rugby	11 – 17	Rotherham Titans
	Report

Lady Bay Sports Ground
Attendance: 954
Referee: John Meredith

=== Round 10 ===
27 November 2015
19:45

(BP) Bristol Rugby	37 – 13	London Scottish
	Report

Ashton Gate
Attendance: 7,145
Referee: Andrew Small

27 November 2015
20:00

(BP) Yorkshire Carnegie	7 – 10	London Welsh
	Report

Headingley
Attendance: 3,672
Referee: Tim Wigglesworth

28 November 2015
14:00

Rotherham Titans	6 – 27	Jersey (BP)
	Report

Clifton Lane
Attendance: 895
Referee: John Meredith

28 November 2015
14:30

(BP) Doncaster Knights	34 – 11	Moseley
	Report

Castle Park
Attendance: 1,493
Referee: Andrew Jackson

28 November 2015
15:00

(BP) Ealing Trailfinders	22 – 34	Nottingham Rugby (BP)
	Report

Trailfinders Sports Ground
Attendance: 310
Referee: Greg Macdonald

29 November 2015
15:00

(BP) Cornish Pirates	32 – 31	Bedford Blues (2BP)
	Report

Mennaye Field
Attendance: 1,025
Referee: Dean Richards

=== Round 11 ===
4 December 2015
19:45

(BP) Jersey	35 – 7	Ealing Trailfinders
	Report

St Peter
Attendance: 2,100
Referee: Ian Tempest

4 December 2015
19:45

Nottingham Rugby	14 – 13	Yorkshire Carnegie (BP)
	Report

Lady Bay Sports Ground
Attendance: 1,864
Referee: Steve Lee

5 December 2015
14:00

London Welsh	19 – 38	Cornish Pirates (BP)
	Report

Old Deer Park
Attendance: 1,055
Referee: Darren Gamage

5 December 2015
15:00

(BP) Bedford Blues	13 – 18	Doncaster Knights
	Report

Goldington Road
Attendance: 2,077
Referee: Tim Wigglesworth

5 December 2015
15:00

London Scottish	21 – 16	Rotherham Titans (BP)
	Report

Athletic Ground
Attendance: 884
Referee: Dean Richards

5 December 2015
15:00

(BP) Moseley	28 – 39	Bristol Rugby (BP)
	Report

Billesley Common
Attendance: 993
Referee: Matt O'Grady

=== Round 12 ===
26 December 2015
14:30

Doncaster Knights	26 – 12	Nottingham Rugby
	Report

Castle Park
Attendance: 2,921
Referee: Matthew O'Grady

26 December 2015
15:00

(2BP) London Scottish	22 – 28	Ealing Trailfinders (BP)
	Report

Athletic Ground
Attendance: 1,260
Referee: Andrew Jackson

26 December 2015
15:00

(2BP) Moseley	24 – 31	Bedford Blues (BP)
	Report

Billesely Common
Attendance: 1,431
Referee: Craig Maxwell Keys

27 December 2015
14:00

Cornish Pirates	16 – 10	Jersey (BP)
	Report

Mennaye Field
Attendance: 2,340
Referee: Andrew Small

27 December 2015
15:00

(BP) Bristol Rugby	35 – 0	London Welsh
	Report

Ashton Gate
Attendance: 11,170
Referee: Luke Pearce

27 December 2015
15:00

(BP) Yorkshire Carnegie	43 – 9	Rotherham Titans
	Report

Headingley
Attendance: 3,292
Referee: Greg Macdonald

=== Round 13 ===
1 January 2016
15:00

(BP) Bedford Blues	31 – 19	London Scottish
	Report

Goldington Road
Attendance: 4,341
Referee: Ian Tempest

2 January 2016
13:30

(BP) London Welsh	32 – 6	Moseley
	Report

Old Deer Park
Attendance: 1,327
Referee: Darren Gamage

2 January 2016
14:00

Rotherham Titans	21 – 38	Cornish Pirates (BP)
	Report

Clifton Lane
Attendance: 1,307
Referee: Andrew Jackson

2 January 2016
14:30

Jersey	17 – 17	Doncaster Knights
	Report

St Peter
Attendance: 1,870
Referee: Dean Richards

2 January 2016
14:30

(BP) Nottingham Rugby	10 – 16	Bristol Rugby
	Report

Lady Bay Sports Ground
Attendance: 1,197
Referee: Tim Wigglesworth

2 January 2016
15:00

Ealing Trailfinders	29 – 45	Yorkshire Carnegie (BP)
	Report

Trailfinders Sports Ground
Attendance: 621
Referee: Matt O'Grady

=== Round 14 ===
30 January 2016
15:00

(BP) Bedford Blues	64 – 20	London Welsh
	Report

Goldington Road
Attendance: 2,612
Referee: Andrew Small

30 January 2016
15:00

London Scottish	22 – 20	Yorkshire Carnegie (BP)
	Report

Athletic Ground
Attendance: 1,236
Referee: Tim Wigglesworth

30 January 2016
15:00

Moseley	8 – 24	Nottingham Rugby
	Report

Billesley Common
Attendance: 1,011
Referee: Ian Tempest

31 January 2016
15:00

(BP) Bristol Rugby	35 – 12	Jersey
	Report

Ashton Gate
Attendance: 6,398
Referee: Matt Carley

31 January 2016
15:00

Cornish Pirates	30 – 15	Ealing Trailfinders
	Report

Mennaye Field
Attendance: 1,348
Referee: John Meredith

31 January 2016
15:15

(BP) Doncaster Knights	34 – 24	Rotherham Titans
	Report

Castle Park
Attendance: 3,287
Referee: Andrew Jackson

=== Round 15 ===
6 February 2016
14:00

(BP) London Welsh	17 – 19	London Scottish
	Report

Old Deer Park
Attendance: 1,207
Referee: Dean Richards

6 February 2016
14:00

Rotherham Titans	17 – 36	Bristol Rugby (BP)
	Report

Clifton Lane
Attendance: 1,236
Referee: Greg MacDonald

6 February 2016
15:00

Ealing Trailfinders	17 – 17	Doncaster Knights
	Report

Trailfinders Ground
Attendance: 425
Referee: Andrew Small

6 February 2016
15:00

Jersey	22 – 18	Moseley (BP)
	Report

St Peter
Attendance: 1,526
Referee: Steve Lee

7 February 2016
15:00

(BP) Nottingham Rugby	18 – 20	Bedford Blues
	Report

Lady Bay Sports Ground
Attendance: 1,067
Referee: John Meredith

7 February 2016
15:00

(BP) Yorkshire Carnegie	33 – 26	Cornish Pirates (BP)
	Report

Headingley Stadium
Attendance: 2,107
Referee: Matthew O'Grady

=== Round 16 ===
12 February 2016
15:00

(BP) Bristol Rugby	63 – 10	Ealing Trailfinders
	Report

Ashton Gate
Attendance: 5,517
Referee: Steve Lee

13 February 2016
14:00

(BP) London Welsh	22 – 18	Nottingham (BP)
	Report

Old Deer Park
Attendance: 730
Referee: Greg Macdonald

13 February 2016
14:30

(BP) Doncaster Knights	34 – 28	Yorkshire Carnegie (2BP)
	Report

Castle Park
Attendance: 2,331
Referee: Luke Pearce

13 February 2016
15:00

(BP) Bedford Blues	18 – 25	Jersey
	Report

Goldington Road
Attendance: 2,162
Referee: Matthew O'Grady

13 February 2016
15:00

London Scottish	21 – 10	Cornish Pirates
	Report

Athletic Ground
Attendance: 1,109
Referee: Chris Riley

13 February 2016
15:00

Moseley	16 – 11	Rotherham Titans (BP)
	Report

Billesley Common
Attendance: 726
Referee: Darren Gamage

=== Round 17 ===
27 February 2016
14:00

(BP) Jersey	14 – 21	London Welsh
	Report

St Peter
Attendance: 2,009
Referee: Michael Hudson

27 February 2016
14:00

(BP) Rotherham Titans	39 – 31	Bedford Blues (BP)
	Report

Clifton Lane
Attendance: 1,107
Referee: Steve Lee

27 February 2016
15:00

(BP) Ealing Trailfinders	55 – 15	Moseley
	Report

Trailfinders Sports Ground
Attendance: 626
Referee: Andrew Small

28 February 2016
15:00

(BP) Cornish Pirates	19 – 26	Doncaster Knights
	Report

Mennaye Field
Attendance: 1,231
Referee: Greg Macdonald

28 February 2016
15:00

Nottingham Rugby	17 – 3	London Scottish
	Report

Lady Bay Sports Ground
Attendance: 940
Referee: Fergus Kirby

28 February 2016
15:00

Yorkshire Carnegie	7 – 23	Bristol Rugby
	Report

Headingley Stadium
Attendance: 2,984
Referee: Darren Gamage

=== Round 18 ===
4 March 2016
19:45

(BP) Nottingham Rugby	15 – 22	Jersey
	Report

Lady Bay Sports Ground
Attendance: 753
Referee: Andrew Small

5 March 2016
14:00

(BP) London Welsh	32 – 16	Rotherham Titans
	Report

Old Deer Park
Attendance: 966
Referee: John Meredith

5 March 2016
15:00

(BP) Bedford Blues	33 – 24	Ealing Trailfinders
	Report

Goldington Road
Attendance: 2,082
Referee: Dean Richards

5 March 2016
15:00

(BP) London Scottish	20 – 26	Doncaster Knights (BP)
	Report

Athletic Ground
Attendance: 1,089
Referee: Matt O'Grady

5 March 2016
15:00

Moseley	12 – 28	Yorkshire Carnegie (BP)
	Report

Billesley Common
Attendance: 1,025
Referee: Tim Wigglesworth

6 March 2016
15:00

(BP) Bristol Rugby	29 – 24	Cornish Pirates (2BP)
	Report

Ashton Gate
Attendance: 7,005
Referee: Christophe Ridley

=== Round 19 ===
25 March 2016
15:00

Jersey	22 – 20	London Scottish (BP)
	Report

St. Peter
Attendance: 2,460
Referee: Darren Gamage

26 March 2016
15:00

(BP) Cornish Pirates	32 – 0	Moseley
	Report

Mennaye Field
Attendance: 1,344
Referee: Dean Richards

26 March 2016
15:00

(BP) Ealing Trailfinders	16 – 22	London Welsh (BP)
	Report

Trailfinders Sports Ground
Attendance: 802
Referee: Greg McDonald

26 March 2016
15:00

Rotherham Titans	22 – 12	Nottingham Rugby
	Report

Clifton Lane
Attendance: 1,188
Referee: Darren Gamage

27 March 2016
13:45

(2BP) Doncaster Knights	29 – 31	Bristol Rugby (BP)
	Report

Castle Park
Attendance: 2,223
Referee: Luke Pearce

27 March 2016
15:00

(BP) Yorkshire Carnegie	35 – 20	Bedford Blues
	Report

Headingley Stadium
Attendance: 1,718
Referee: John Meredith

=== Round 20 ===
1 April 2016
19:30

Moseley	23 – 38	Doncaster Knights (BP)
	Report

Billesley Common
Attendance: 1,108
Referee: Ian Tempest

1 April 2016
19:45

(BP) Nottingham Rugby	22 – 18	Ealing Trailfinders (BP)
	Report

Lady Bay Sports Ground
Attendance: 978
Referee: Dean Richards

2 April 2016
14:00

(2BP) London Welsh	28 – 31	Yorkshire Carnegie (BP)
	Report

Old Deer Park
Attendance: 1,463
Referee: Matthew O'Grady

2 April 2016
15:00

(BP) Bedford Blues	54 – 46	Cornish Pirates (BP)
	Report

Goldington Road
Attendance: 3,035
Referee: Greg MacDonald

2 April 2016
15:00

(BP) Jersey	44 – 27	Rotherham Titans
	Report

St. Peter
Attendance: 1,987
Referee: Michael Hudson

2 April 2016
15:00

(BP) London Scottish	16 – 21	Bristol Rugby
	Report

Athletic Ground
Attendance: 1,850
Referee: John Meredith

=== Round 21 ===
15 April 2016
19:45

Bristol Rugby	24 – 22	Moseley (BP)
	Report

Ashton Gate
Attendance: 6,449
Referee: Tom Foley

- Moseley are relegated after Ealing beat Jersey during the Saturday fixture.

16 April 2016
14:30

Doncaster Knights	28 – 24	Bedford Blues (BP)
	Report

Castle Park
Attendance: 2,446
Referee: Dean Richards

16 April 2016
15:00

Ealing Trailfinders	30 – 24	Jersey (BP)
	Report

Trailfinders Sports Ground
Attendance: 658
Referee: Ian Tempest

16 April 2016
15:00

(BP) Rotherham Titans	17 – 22	London Scottish
	Report

Clifton Lane
Attendance: 983
Referee: Chris Ridley

17 April 2016
15:00

(BP) Cornish Pirates	38 – 38	London Welsh (BP)
	Report

Mennaye Field
Attendance: 1,568
Referee: Jack Makepeace

17 April 2016
15:00

(BP) Yorkshire Carnegie	37 – 27	Nottingham Rugby (BP)
	Report

Headingley Stadium
Attendance: 2,147
Referee: Greg Macdonald

=== Round 22 ===
23 April 2016
14:30

(BP) Nottingham Rugby	55 – 33	Cornish Pirates (BP)
	Report

Lady Bay Sports Ground
Attendance: 1,235
Referee: Matt O'Grady

23 April 2016
15:00

Bedford Blues	6 – 39	Bristol Rugby (BP)
	Report

Goldington Road
Attendance: 3,224
Referee: John Meredith

23 April 2016
15:00

(BP) Ealing Trailfinders	45 – 12	Rotherham Titans
	Report

Trailfinders Sports Ground
Attendance: 667
Referee: Fergus Kirby

23 April 2016
15:00

Jersey	0 – 34	Yorkshire Carnegie (BP)
	Report

St Peter
Attendance: 2,613
Referee: Andrew Small

23 April 2016
15:00

(BP) London Welsh	24 – 19	Doncaster Knights (BP)
	Report

Priory Lane (Note: London Welsh played their home match at Rosslyn Park's ground because Old Deer Park was booked for a food fayre)
Attendance: 1,092
Referee: Andrew Jackson

23 April 2016
15:00

(BP) Moseley	24 – 75	London Scottish (BP)
	Report

Billesley Common
Attendance: 1,299
Referee: Jack Makepeace

== Play-offs ==
=== Semi-finals ===
The semifinals follow a 1 v 4, 2 v 3 system – with the games being played over two legs and the higher placed team choosing which leg they play at home. Both Bristol and Doncaster elected to play the second leg at home and therefore visited Bedford Blues and Yorkshire Carnegie respectively in the first legs on 1 May. The grounds of three of the teams met the minimum standards required to play in the Premiership next season. If Doncaster Knights were promoted they would initially play their matches at the Keepmoat Stadium, the home of Doncaster Rovers while Bristol and Yorkshire Carnegie would continue to their current stadia. Bedford Blues did not apply to have their ground audited and, therefore, could not win promotion; if they had won the play-off final, the last-placed team in the Premiership (London Irish) would not have been relegated.

==== First leg ====
1 May 2016
15:00

Yorkshire Carnegie	17–30	Doncaster Knights
	Report

Headingley Stadium
Attendance: 3,102
Referee: Craig Maxwell-Keys

1 May 2016
15:15

Bedford Blues	16–45	Bristol Rugby
	Report

Goldington Road
Attendance: 2,662
Referee: Luke Pearce

==== Second leg ====
8 May 2016
14:30

Doncaster Knights	14–17	Yorkshire Carnegie
	Report

Castle Park
Attendance: 4,797
Referee: Ian Tempest

- Doncaster Knights won 44–34 on aggregate

8 May 2016
15:15

Bristol Rugby	45–19	Bedford Blues
	Report

Ashton Gate
Attendance: 12,030
Referee: Dean Richards

- Bristol Rugby won 90–35 on aggregate

=== Final ===
The final is played over two legs – with the higher placed team deciding who plays at home in the first leg.

==== First leg ====
18 May 2016
19:45

Doncaster Knights	13–28	Bristol Rugby
Try: Hurrell (1) 23'c Con: Cusack (1/1) 23'; Pen: Cusack (2) 3', 39'	Bristol; Knights	Try: Lemi 35'm McMillan 46'c Glynn 50'c Con: Sheedy (2/3) 46', 50'; Pen: Sheedy (3) 19', 26', 66'

Castle Park
Attendance: 4,759
Referee: Wayne Barnes

==== Second leg ====
25 May 2016
19:45

Bristol Rugby	32–34	Doncaster Knights
	Report

Ashton Gate
Attendance: 16,084
Referee: Matthew Carley

- Bristol won 60–47 on aggregate

== Attendances ==
- Includes playoff games.

Club	Home Games	Total	Average	Highest	Lowest	% Capacity
Bedford Blues	12	31,333	2,611	4,341	2,077	52%
Bristol Rugby	13	100,129	7,702	16,084	4,560	46%
Cornish Pirates	11	15,705	1,428	2,340	1,025	36%
Doncaster Knights	13	29,937	2,303	4,797	1,019	46%
Ealing Trailfinders	11	7,338	667	874	310	22%
Jersey	11	22,790	2,072	2,613	1,526	41%
London Scottish	11	12,809	1,164	1,850	884	26%
London Welsh	11	13,214	1,201	2,032	730	24%
Moseley	11	11,509	1,046	1,431	726	35%
Nottingham Rugby	11	11,202	1,018	1,864	623	51%
Rotherham Titans	11	12,980	1,180	1,721	887	48%
Yorkshire Carnegie	12	28,520	2,377	3,672	1,329	11%

== Individual statistics ==
- Note that points scorers includes tries as well as conversions, penalties and drop goals. Appearance figures also include coming on as substitutes (unused substitutes not included). Stats also cover playoff games.

=== Top points scorers ===
Rank	Player	Team	Appearances	Points
1	(Wales) Gavin Henson	Bristol	17	193
2	(Ireland) Peter Lydon	London Scottish	22	182
3	(Scotland) Dougie Flockhart	Doncaster Knights	15	169
4	(England) Jake Sharp	Bedford Blues	19	140
4	(South Africa) Brendan Cope	Jersey	20	125
6	(England) Glyn Hughes	Moseley	19	118
7	(England) Dan Mugford	Nottingham Rugby	17	111
8	(Ireland) Declan Cusack	Doncaster Knights	19	103
9	(Scotland) Harry Leonard	Yorkshire Carnegie	17	101
10	(New Zealand) Paul Grant	Nottingham Rugby	22	95

=== Top try scorers ===
Rank	Player	Team	Appearances	Tries
1	(New Zealand) Paul Grant	Nottingham Rugby	22	19
2	(Tonga) Latu Makaafi	Doncaster Knights	25	18
3	(New Zealand) Mark Bright	London Scottish	22	17
4	(England) Olly Robinson	Bristol	19	14
5	(England) Dean Adamson	Bedford Blues	14	12
5	(England) Tom Varndell	Bristol	21	12
6	(England) Josh Bainbridge	Yorkshire Carnegie	10	11
6	(Tonga) Viliame Iongi	Nottingham Rugby	11	11
6	(Wales) Kyle Evans	Moseley	20	11
7	(Canada) Matt Evans	Cornish Pirates	12	10

== Season records ==
=== Team ===
Largest home win — 53 pts

63 - 10 Bristol Rugby at home to Ealing Trailfinders on 12 February 2016

Largest away win — 43 pts

75 - 24 London Scottish away to Moseley on 23 April 2016

Most points scored — 75

75 - 24 London Scottish away to Moseley on 23 April 2016

Most tries in a match — 11

75 - 24 London Scottish away to Moseley on 23 April 2016

Most conversions in a match — 10

London Scottish away to Moseley on 23 April 2016

Most penalties in a match — 6 (x3)

Moseley away to London Scottish on 4 September 2015
Doncaster Knights away to Bedford Blues on 5 December 2015
Bristol Rugby away to Yorkshire Carnegie on 28 February 2016

Most drop goals in a match — 1

N/A - multiple teams

=== Player ===
Most points in a match — 25

(England) Josh Bainbridge for Yorkshire Carnegie away to Bristol Rugby on 18 October 2015

Most tries in a match — 5

(England) Josh Bainbridge for Yorkshire Carnegie away to Bristol Rugby on 18 October 2015

Most conversions in a match — 9

(Ireland) Peter Lydon for London Scottish away to Moseley on 23 April 2016

Most penalties in a match — 6 (x3)

(England) Glyn Hughes for Moseley away to London Scottish on 4 September 2015
(Scotland) Dougie Flockhart for Doncaster Knights away to Bedford Blues on 5 December 2015
(Wales) Gavin Henson for Bristol Rugby away to Yorkshire Carnegie on 28 February 2016

Most drop goals in a match — 1

N/A - multiple players

=== Attendances ===
Highest — 16,084

Bristol Rugby at home to Doncaster Knights on 25 May 2016

Lowest — 310

Ealing Trailfinders at home to Nottingham Rugby on 28 November 2015

Highest Average Attendance — 7,702

Bristol Rugby

Lowest Average Attendance — 667

Ealing Trailfinders

== See also ==
- 2015–16 British and Irish Cup
