= Midlands Rugby League =

- Founded: 2006
- Country: England
- Number of clubs: 10
- Level on pyramid: 6
- Domestic cup: Challenge Cup

The Midlands Rugby League is a series of summer rugby league competition for amateur teams in the Midlands. The competition was formed in 2006 as the RLC Midlands Premier. Its name changed following the 2012 restructure of amateur rugby league in Great Britain

At current the league operates the Midlands Rugby League Premier Division and Midlands Rugby League Championship, in addition to a Midlands Cup and Plate.

== History ==
The Rugby League Conference (RLC) was born in 1997, then known as the Southern Conference.

The RLC Midlands Division (now Midlands Rugby League Championship) was first created in 2001 and lasted until 2003 as the league was split in two parallel divisions due to it being oversubscribed.

The RLC Premier Divisions were set up in 2005 for teams who had achieved a certain playing standard and were able to travel further afield to find stronger opposition. The new Premier Divisions included the North Premier, the South Premier, the Central Premier and the Welsh Premier. The Central Premier had two Midlands clubs Telford Raiders and Nottingham Outlaws and the rest of the clubs were from Yorkshire or Lancashire.

The Midlands Premier was created one season later in 2006, and placed between the existing RLC Midlands Division and the RLC National Division. The founder members were Coventry Bears, Telford Raiders, Nottingham Outlaws, Derby City, Birmingham Bulldogs, Leicester Phoenix and Wolverhampton Wizards.

A Midlands Merit League (now defunct) was founded in late 2005 as a feeder league for the RLC Midlands Division, this later Midlands Rugby League Division Two before folding.

In 2012 the Rugby League Conference was disbanded and all divisions adopting the name Midlands Rugby League.

== Position in Pyramid ==
- 1: Super League
- 2: Championship
- 3–5: National Community Rugby League
- 6: Midlands Rugby League Premier Division
- 7: Midlands Rugby League Championship

== Clubs ==
As of 2024: Birmingham Bulldogs, Coventry Bears, Leamington Royals, Oxford Cavaliers, Nottingham Outlaws, Sherwood Wolf Hunt, Swindon St George, Telford Raiders.

== League standings ==
=== Premier Division ===
Current Teams	2006	2007	2008	2009	2010	2017	2018	2019	2020	2021	2022	2023	2024	2025
Bedford Tigers	x	x	3rd	x	x	x	x	x	COVID-19	COVID-19	x	x	x	
Birmingham Bulldogs	6th	6th	6th	4th		3rd	South 3rd	South 1st	COVID-19	COVID-19	2nd	2nd	3rd	
Boston Buccaneers						x	North 4th	North 3rd	COVID-19	COVID-19	x	x	x	
Bristol Sonics	x	x	x	3rd		x	x	x	COVID-19	COVID-19	x	x	x	
Coventry Bears	2nd	1st	2nd	1st		6th	x	x	COVID-19	COVID-19	1st	5th	6th	
Derby City	4th	5th	5th	2nd		x	North 2nd	North 2nd	COVID-19	COVID-19	x	x	x	
Gloucestershire Warriors	x	3rd	4th	6th		x	x	x	COVID-19	COVID-19	x	x	x	
Leicester Phoenix	3rd	8th	7th	5th		x	x	x	COVID-19	COVID-19	x	x	x	
Leamington Royals						7th	South 2nd	South 3rd	COVID-19	COVID-19	4th	4th	7th	
North East Worcestershire Ravens						x	South 4th	South 4th	COVID-19	COVID-19	x	x	x	
Nottingham Outlaws	1st	2nd	1st	x	x	2nd	North 3rd	North 4th	COVID-19	COVID-19	x	x	2nd	
Oxford Cavaliers						5th	x	x	COVID-19	COVID-19	3rd	3rd	5th	
Redditch Ravens	x	x	x	DNF	x	x	x	x	COVID-19	COVID-19	x	x	x	
Somerset Vikings	x	4th	x	x	x	x	x	x	COVID-19	COVID-19	x	x	x	
Sherwood Wolf Hunt						4th	North 1st	North 1st	COVID-19	COVID-19	x	x	4th	
Swindon St George						8th	x	x	COVID-19	COVID-19	x	x	8th	
Telford Raiders	5th	7th	x	7th	x	1st	South 1st	South 2nd	COVID-19	COVID-19	5th	1st	1st	
Wolverhampton Wizards	7th	x	x	x	x	x	x	x	COVID-19	COVID-19	x	x	x	

=== Key ===
DNF	Did not complete the season
x	Did not participate
	Divisional winner
	Qualified for divisional play-off
	Finished bottom

== Titles ==
=== Premier Division ===
==== RLC Midlands Premier era ====
- 2006 Nottingham Outlaws
- 2007 Coventry Bears
- 2008 Nottingham Outlaws
- 2009 Coventry Bears 48 Derby City 16
- 2010 Coventry Bears
- 2011 Bristol Sonics

==== Midlands Rugby League Premier Division era ====
- 2012 Northampton Demons
- 2013 Telford Raiders
- 2014 Northampton Demons
- 2015 Northampton Demons
- 2016 Coventry Dragons
- 2017 Northampton Demons
- 2018 Telford Raiders
- 2019 Sherwood Wolf Hunt
- 2020 Cancelled due to the COVID-19 pandemic
- 2021 Cancelled due to the COVID-19 pandemic
- 2022 Birmingham Bulldogs
- 2023 Telford Raiders
- 2024 Telford Raiders

=== Championship ===
==== RLC Midlands Division era ====
- 2001 RLC Midlands Division: Coventry Bears
- 2002 RLC Midlands Division: Coventry Bears
- 2003 RLC Midlands Division: Birmingham Bulldogs
- 2004 RLC North Midlands Division: Nottingham Outlaws, RLC South Midlands Division: Leicester Phoenix
- 2005 RLC North Midlands Division: Thorne Moor Marauders (now Moorends-Thorne Marauders RLFC), RLC West Midlands Division: Wolverhampton Wizards (now Wolverhampton RLFC)

==== RLC Midlands Regional era ====
- 2006 RLC North Midlands & South Yorkshire Division: Moorends-Thorne Marauders RLFC, RLC West Midlands and South West Division: Gloucestershire Warriors
- 2007 RLC West Midlands Division: Bristol Sonics
- 2008 RLC West Midlands Division: Bristol Sonics
- 2009 RLC North Midlands Division: Parkside Hawks
- 2010 RLC Midlands Division: Leamington Royals
- 2011 RLC Midlands Division: Telford Raiders

==== Midlands Rugby League Division One era ====
- 2012 Telford Raiders
- 2013 Coventry Bears A
- 2014 Unknown
- 2015 Sherwood Wolf Hunt
- 2016 Sherwood Wolf Hunt

==== Midlands Rugby League Championship era ====
- 2017 Unknown
- 2018 Unknown
- 2019 Lemington Royals
- 2020 Cancelled due to the COVID-19 pandemic
- 2021 Cancelled due to the COVID-19 pandemic
- 2022 Unknown
- 2023 Unknown

=== Merit League ===
==== RLC Midlands Merit League era ====
- 2006 South Humber Rabbitohs
- 2007 St Helens Wild Boars
- 2008 Moorends-Thorne Marauders ML
- 2009 Birmingham Bulldogs A
- 2010 Leicester Storm A
- 2011 Hope Valley Hawks

==== Midlands Rugby League Division Two era ====
- 2012 Hope Valley Hawks
- 2013 Leamington Royals
- 2014 Unknown
- 2015 Unknown
- 2016 Unknown

== Junior League ==
The 2007 season saw the introduction of an informal under-15 league Midlands Junior League based on Merit League principles. In 2008 the junior competition featured under-14 and under-16 divisions.

Midlands clubs voted against clubs outside the Midlands being included for the 2010 season. In 2010 the Under-12s took a tournament based format and Under-11s and Girls Under-12s started on a similar basis.

2011 saw the addition of an Under-18s league and saw the Under-14s take on a tournament based format, with the Under-12s replaced by an Under-13s.

From 2018, the league system was replaced by friendly matches and festivals, returning the region to the Midlands Junior Development League. Clubs were encouraged to arrange their own fixtures and to also attend centralised festivals throughout the summer months. Bassetlaw Bulldogs and Immmingham Wasps played the first game in the RFL's new flagship Player Development League on 12th May 2018.

Following a number of years of steady growth, in 2023, the Midlands Junior League continued its development, following the formation of a new Midlands Junior League Steering group. 4 regional festivals at U7-U16 age groups were played during the summer of 2023, with a host of friendly fixtures arranged between clubs also.

Festivals were held at Bassetlaw Bulldogs, Shrewsbury Lions, Sherwood Wolfhunt and NEW Ravens RLFC.

=== Current clubs ===
The following teams participated in 2023, across a range of age groups from U7s to U15s:

2023 Clubs
	Club	Further information
1	Bassetlaw Bulldogs	Website Facebook Twitter
2	Bolsover Bulls	Website Facebook Twitter
3	Coventry Bears	Website Facebook Twitter
4	Immingham Wasps	Facebook Twitter
5	Isle of Axholm	Facebook Twitter
6	Leamington Royals	Website Facebook Twitter
7	Moorends Marauders	Website Facebook Twitter
8	NEW Ravens	Website Facebook Twitter
9	Sherwood Wolfhunt	Website Facebook Twitter
10	Shrewsbury Knights	Website Facebook Twitter
11	Swindon St George	Website Facebook Twitter
12	Telford Raiders	Website Facebook Twitter

=== Past winners ===
- 2007 Under-15s: Telford Raiders
- 2008 Under-14s: Derby Dragons, Under-16s: Northampton Knights
- 2009 Under-12s: Northampton Knights, Under-14s: Redditch Ravens, Under-16s: Nottingham Outlaws
- 2010 Under-12s: Northampton Knights, Under-14s: Telford Raiders, Under-16s: Birmingham Bulldogs
- 2011 Under-16s: Coventry Bears, Under-18s: Northampton Demons
- 2012 Under-16s: Gloucestershire All Golds, Under-18s: Leicester Storm
