= Bassetlaw Bulldogs Rugby League Football Club =

Rugby League club

Bassetlaw Bulldogs
Club information
- Full name: Bassetlaw Bulldogs Rugby League Football Club
- Nickname: The Bulldogs
- Founded: 2018
- Website: www.bassetlawbulldogs.co.uk

Current details
- Ground: Queen Elizabeth II Playing Field, East Markham, Nottinghamshire (500)
- Competition: Midlands Junior League, National Girls League (Yorkshire Division 1), Masters

Uniforms
Home colours

East Markham, Nottinghamshire
East Markham (the United Kingdom)

Bassetlaw Bulldogs Rugby League Football Club is a rugby league team based in Nottinghamshire, England. It is one of only three rugby league teams in the county.

The club operates outside the traditional heartland areas of rugby league (namely the North of England) and is a member of the Midlands Rugby League.

As the club was initially established as a junior club, and continues to run a range of teams across all junior age groups alongside its newer open-age team, Bassetlaw Bulldogs RLFC engages in a long-term sponsorship deal with Focus on Young People in Bassetlaw, a charity championing the development of young people across the district. The club's Youth and Masters teams are sponsored by Ballards Removals.

== Facilities ==
Games are played at the home ground, East Markham Playing Field. In June 2022, a new Sports Pavilion was opened on the site.The facility includes changing rooms for players and match officials, a communal area and toilets. The facility was heavily influenced by the club chairperson, Phil Abbott, who raised in excess of £125,000 of funds for the project.

The record, capacity crowd of 500 was achieved in May 2023 when the club hosted the Midlands Rugby League Junior Festival.

== History and notable firsts ==
The club was founded in 2018 by Phil Abbott, a long-time servant of the community game, having previously co-founded Brentwood RLFC in Essex in 2004.

Bassetlaw Bulldogs RLFC has provided a number of firsts in the game of rugby league. In June 2018, alongside fellow Midlands Rugby League members, Immingham Wasps, the club played the first ever Player Development League fixture in England as part of the Rugby Football League's sport expansion plan.

Furthermore, the Bulldogs club is the only Nottinghamshire-based team who are affiliated with professional Rugby League team Wakefield Trinity, with whom they hold Ambassador Club status.

In 2023, a further notable first came in the shape of the inception of an U13s girls team, who became the only Nottinghamshire-based girls team to play in a formal national league, administrated by the Rugby Football League. On 1 July 2023, the team became the first from outside the traditional rugby league heartlands to win a game in the National League (East Division B) when they beat Batley Girls by 32–30.

In August 2023, the club became the first in Nottinghamshire to join the Masters Rugby League, a game derived for players over the age of 35 years old. Making their debut against The Rebels Rugby League team, they then went on to complete a full season of fixtures in 2024, including playing at the National Festival in Blackpool in September 2024.

In November 2023, the club was named Midlands Junior League Club of the Year in the inaugural awards. The Girls U13s team also became the first ever recipients of the Team of the Year award, made by the Rugby Football League. This particular award was presented by Jodie Cunningham, captain of both the England women's national rugby league team and St Helens RFC Women's Rugby League team.

On 1 June 2024, the Girls U14s won their first ever away game with a win at a West Leeds, by 20 points to 10. This was the first win away from home by a Nottinghamshire team in the National Girls Competition against a heartlands team in the history of Rugby League. This was then backed up with the current record victory of 56–8 at home to Hull FC on 15 June 2024.

== Club Development ==
Since its establishment in 2018, the club has grown at a strong rate. This growth was stunted by the COVID-19 pandemic, which brought disruption to all sport through lockdowns and restrictions, however this did not stop the club pushing forward with its activity when allowed.

In August 2023, the club introduced its 8th different team, with the inception of an over-35s Masters Rugby League team.

== Roll of honour ==
Rugby Football League Junior Coach of the Year (Andrew Blythe) 2025

Midlands Junior League Team of the Year (U13s girls) 2023
Midlands Junior League Team of the Year (U7s) 2025

Midlands Junior League Club of the Year 2023
Midlands Junior League Club of the Year 2025

Midlands Junior League Volunteer of the Year 2024, Phil Abbott

International Representation
Phil Abbott, England, October 31st 2026 v Scotland and Ireland
