= Listed buildings in East Markham =

East Markham is a civil parish in the Bassetlaw District of Nottinghamshire, England. The parish contains 21 listed buildings that are recorded in the National Heritage List for England. Of these, one is listed at Grade I, the highest of the three grades, and the others are at Grade II, the lowest grade. The parish contains the village of East Markham and the surrounding countryside. Most of the listed buildings are houses, cottages and associated structures, farmhouses and farm buildings, including three pigeoncotes. The other listed buildings consist of a church, a pinfold, a former windmill, a school and a war memorial.

== Key ==
| Grade | Criteria |
|---|---|
| I | Buildings of exceptional interest, sometimes considered to be internationally important |
| II | Buildings of national importance and special interest |

== Buildings ==
| Name and location | Photograph | Date | Notes | Grade |
|---|---|---|---|---|
| Church of St John the Baptist; 53.24583°N 0.88777°W | | 14th century | The church has been altered and extended through the centuries, including a restoration in 1883–87 by J. Oldrid Scott, who also rebuilt the aisles. The church is built in stone, and consists of a nave with a clerestory, north and south aisles, a south porch, a southeast rood turret, a chancel, and a west tower. The tower has three stages, angle buttresses, bands, eight gargoyles, and an embattled parapet with eight crocketed pinnacles. On the west front is a doorway with a moulded surround, a pointed arch and a hood mould, above which is a three-light window with a hood mould. On the south front is a canopied niche with finials containing a statue of a robed figure. There are also clock faces, stair windows and two-light bell openings. The parapets of the body of the church are also embattled. | I |
| Norwood Cottage; 53.24630°N 0.88836°W | | Early 17th century | The cottage was later extended. The early part has a timber framed core, the whole cottage is roughcast, and has a pantile roof, the right gable with slate coping. There is a single storey and attics, four bays, and a rear lean-to. The windows are horizontally-sliding sashes, those in the ground floor with segmental projecting lintels, and in the attics in box dormers. | II |
| Springfield Barn; 53.24690°N 0.88971°W | — | 17th century | The barn has a timber framed core, it is encased in red brick, and has a pantile roof. There are three bays, and a small lean-to. The barn contains a central segmental-headed double cart entrance, a loft opening, and vents. | II |
| The Manor; 53.24554°N 0.88865°W | | Mid 17th century | The house, which was later extended, is in red brick and stone, on a chamfered stone plinth, with a floor band, and pantile roofs with coped gables and kneelers. There are two storeys, a basement and attics, and an L-shaped plan with a front of five bays. In the centre is a doorway with a moulded surround and casement windows; all the openings are under segmental arches. | II |
| Markham Hall and Cottage; 53.24826°N 0.89013°W | | c. 1700 | The front of the house was added in 1777, and it was later divided into a house and a cottage. It is in brick with red stretchers and pale headers, on a plinth, with stone dressings, and a hipped slate roof. There are two storeys and attics, and a front of seven bays, with a floor band, a moulded cornice, and the middle three bays projecting slightly under a pediment. In the centre is a doorway with panelled pilasters, an archivolt with a fluted keystone, a traceried fanlight, spandrels with paterae, and a pediment. The windows are sashes, the window above the doorway with an architrave, a fluted keystone and a segmental pediment, and the other windows with wedge lintels and keystones. Recessed on the right is a wing containing a bow window, and at the rear are wings containing a stair Venetian window. | II |
| Cush Pool House; 53.24949°N 0.88852°W | | Early 18th century | The front was added to the house in the late 18th century. The house is in red brick, with dentilled eaves and a hipped pantile roof. The front range has two storeys and attics, and three bays, and the earlier rear wing has two storeys and five bays. On the front is a central doorway with a traceried fanlight, and the windows are sashes. | II |
| Pigeoncote, Bower Hayes; 53.24832°N 0.88622°W | | Mid 18th century | The pigeoncote is in red brick on a stone plinth, with a floor band, and a pantile roof with brick coped gables and kneelers. There are two storeys and a loft, and a single bay. It contains doorways, and in the loft are blocked pigeon entrances. Inside there are brick nesting boxes. | II |
| Pinfold; 53.24859°N 0.88718°W | | 18th century | The pinfold is a rectangular enclosure measuring 10 metres (33 ft) by 12 metres (39 ft), and built into a bank. It is surrounded by a stone wall with moulded coping, and on the roadside is a gateway with an iron gate. | II |
| December Cottage; 53.24941°N 0.89287°W | | Mid 18th century | The cottage is in whitewashed rendered brick with a pantile roof. There are two storeys and attics, three bays, and a lean-to running from it. On the front is a central doorway and horizontally-sliding sash windows with segmental heads, and in the lean-to is a doorway and a casement window. | II |
| Pond Farmhouse; 53.24994°N 0.88833°W | | Late 18th century | The front was added to the farmhouse in the 19th century. It is in brick with red stretchers and pink headers, dentilled eaves, and a hipped pantile roof. There are two storeys, a front of three bays, and a lower rear wing with two bays. The central doorway has a fanlight, the windows are sashes, and all the openings have painted wedge lintels and keystones. | II |
| Pigeoncote and farm buildings, Pond Farm; 53.25014°N 0.88831°W | | Late 18th century | The farm buildings are in red brick, some on a plinth, and have pantile roofs. The stable block, with a pigeoncote above, has dogtooth eaves, two storeys and three bays. In the centre is a stable door under a segmental arch, and above are entrances for pigeons, with wooden platforms. To the left and right are other farm buildings, including stables, cowhouses and a barn. | II |
| The Rosary; 53.24644°N 0.88553°W | — | Late 18th century | A red brick house with some rendering and colour washing, it has dentilled eaves, and a pantile roof with slate coped gables and kneelers. There are two storeys and attics, a front range of four bays, a recessed lean-to on the right, and on the left is a single-storey single-bay wing with a lean-to. On the front is a doorway with a traceried fanlight, and horizontally-sliding sash windows, those in the ground floor with segmental heads. | II |
| Whitehouse Farmhouse and barn 53.24700°N 0.88893°W | | Late 18th century | The farmhouse is in colourwashed render on red brick, and has a pantile roof. There are two storeys, four bays, and a rear lean-to. On the front is a doorway with a gabled hood, and horizontally-sliding sash windows, the windows in the ground floor with cambered heads. The barn to the left is lower, with two storeys and three bays, and a lean-to on the left. It is in red brick with dentilled eaves. In the ground floor are two arched doorways, a window under a segmental arch and slit vents, and in the upper floor are two windows and vents in a lozenge pattern. | II |
| Pigeoncote, Woodward Farm; 53.24707°N 0.88611°W | | Late 18th century | The pigeoncote is in red brick on a stone plinth, with a floor band and a pantile roof. There are two storeys and a single bay, and in the centre is a blocked doorway. | II |
| High Brecks Farmhouse; 53.25573°N 0.86926°W | | Early 19th century | The farmhouse is in red brick, rendered at the base, and it has a hipped pantile roof with projecting eaves. There are two storeys and an L-shaped plan, with a front of three bays and a recessed single storey single-bay wing on the left. On the front is a doorway with a fanlight, sash windows in the ground floor, and arched casement windows above. The east front has four bays, and contains a doorway with pilasters and an entablature, and a doorway with a segmental head. Attached to the right is an outbuilding with a single storey and nine bays. | II |
| York House; 53.24991°N 0.89860°W | | Early 19th century | The house is in red brick with dentilled eaves and a pantile roof. There are two storeys and attics, three bays, and rear extensions with one and two storeys. In the centre is a doorway with a fanlight, above it is a blind recessed panel, and the windows are sashes. | II |
| Windmill; 53.24464°N 0.90784°W | | c. 1840 | The tower windmill, which has been converted for residential use, is in tarred red brick, with a raised eaves band, and four storeys. It contains two doorways and casement windows, all under segmental arches. | II |
| Honeysuckle House; 53.24517°N 0.88783°W | — | Mid 19th century | The former rectory is in rendered red brick on a stone plinth, and has a slate roof with stone coped gables. There are two storeys, three bays, and rear wings. On the front is a central blocked opening, and sash windows. | II |
| Wall, railings and gate, Cush Pool House; 53.24949°N 0.88839°W | | Late 19th century | The garden is enclosed by a wall in painted render and brick, with moulded rendered coping. On the wall are decorative iron railings, and it contains an iron gate. At the ends of the wall are brick piers with recessed panels on a rendered base. At the top of each pier is a rendered band, and a smaller brick block with rendered and painted shaped coping. | II |
| Primary school 53.25300°N 0.89278°W | | 1877 | The school is in red brick on a plinth, with stone dressings, a moulded eaves band, and a slate roof with stone coped gables, finials and ventilators. There is a single storey and eight bays, two with gables, divided by buttresses, and flanking lean-tos. The windows are mullioned and transomed. In each gable end is a rose window, and on the front is an inscribed and dated plaque. | II |
| War memorial 53.25169°N 0.89358°W | | 1920 | The war memorial stands by a road junction, and is in polished pink granite. It consists of a Doric column, with the top deliberately broken and placed beside the memorial. The column is in a tapering base, on two chamfered plinths, on four rock-faced steps. On the base are the names of those lost in the two World Wars and the Korean War. | II |
