= Church of St John the Baptist, East Markham =

Church in Nottinghamshire, England

Coordinates: 53°14′44″N 00°53′16″W

Church of St. John the Baptist, East Markham
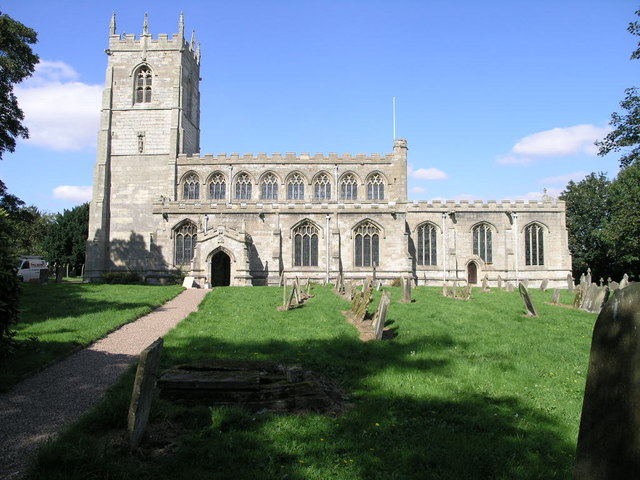
- Church of St. John the Baptist, East Markham
- Denomination: Church of England
- Churchmanship: Broad Church

History
- Dedication: St. John the Baptist

Administration
- Province: York
- Diocese: Southwell and Nottingham
- Deanery: Bassetlaw & Bawtry
- Parish: East Markham

Clergy
- Vicar: In vacancy

The Church of St. John the Baptist, East Markham is a parish church in the Church of England in East Markham, Nottinghamshire.

The church is Grade I listed by the Department for Digital, Culture, Media and Sport as a building of outstanding architectural or historic interest.

== History ==
The church is medieval and was restored between 1883 and 1887 by John Oldrid Scott.

The East window is by Ninian Comper.

== Parish structure ==
The church is in a group of parishes which includes

- St. Nicholas' Church, Askham
- St. Helen's Church, Grove
- Church of St. John the Baptist, East Markham
- St. Peter's Church, Headon-cum-Upton

== See also ==
- Grade I listed buildings in Nottinghamshire
- Listed buildings in East Markham
