= Will Hurrell =

English rugby union player

- Born: William Harry Hurrell; 15 January 1990 (age 36) Melton Mowbray, Leicestershire, England
- Height: 1.86 m (6 ft 1 in)
- Weight: 108 kg (17 st 0 lb)
- School: Loughborough Grammar School, Wyggeston and Queen Elizabeth I College

Rugby union career
- Position: Centre
- Current team: Bristol
Senior career
Years	Team	Apps	(Points)
2009–2011	Leicester Tigers	4	(5)
2011–2012	London Welsh	17	(10)
- Doncaster
2015–2016	Bristol	28	(35)
	→ Bath	68	
- Correct as of 18 October

William Harry Hurrell (born 15 January 1990) is an English former rugby union player who played as a centre for London Welsh, Leicester, Coventry, Doncaster, Bristol Bears and Bath.

Born in Melton Mowbray and a product of Melton R.F.C, Hurrell was educated at Loughborough Grammar School and Wyggeston and Queen Elizabeth I College. He was capped by the England U20s.

Hurrell began his career with Leicester Tigers before joining London Welsh for their Championship-winning season in 2011–12. He left the club at the end of the season to study at Aston University. He played for Coventry in National League 1 while at university, before joining Doncaster ahead of the 2015–16 Championship season. After being named in the Championship team of the season, he joined Bristol Bears in the summer of 2016. He spent half a season on loan at Bath in 2018.

Hurrell announced his retirement in April 2020 on medical advice after suffering a probable stroke following a head injury in a game against Leicester.
