= East Markham =

Coordinates: 53.25°N 0.89°W

- Village and Civil parish
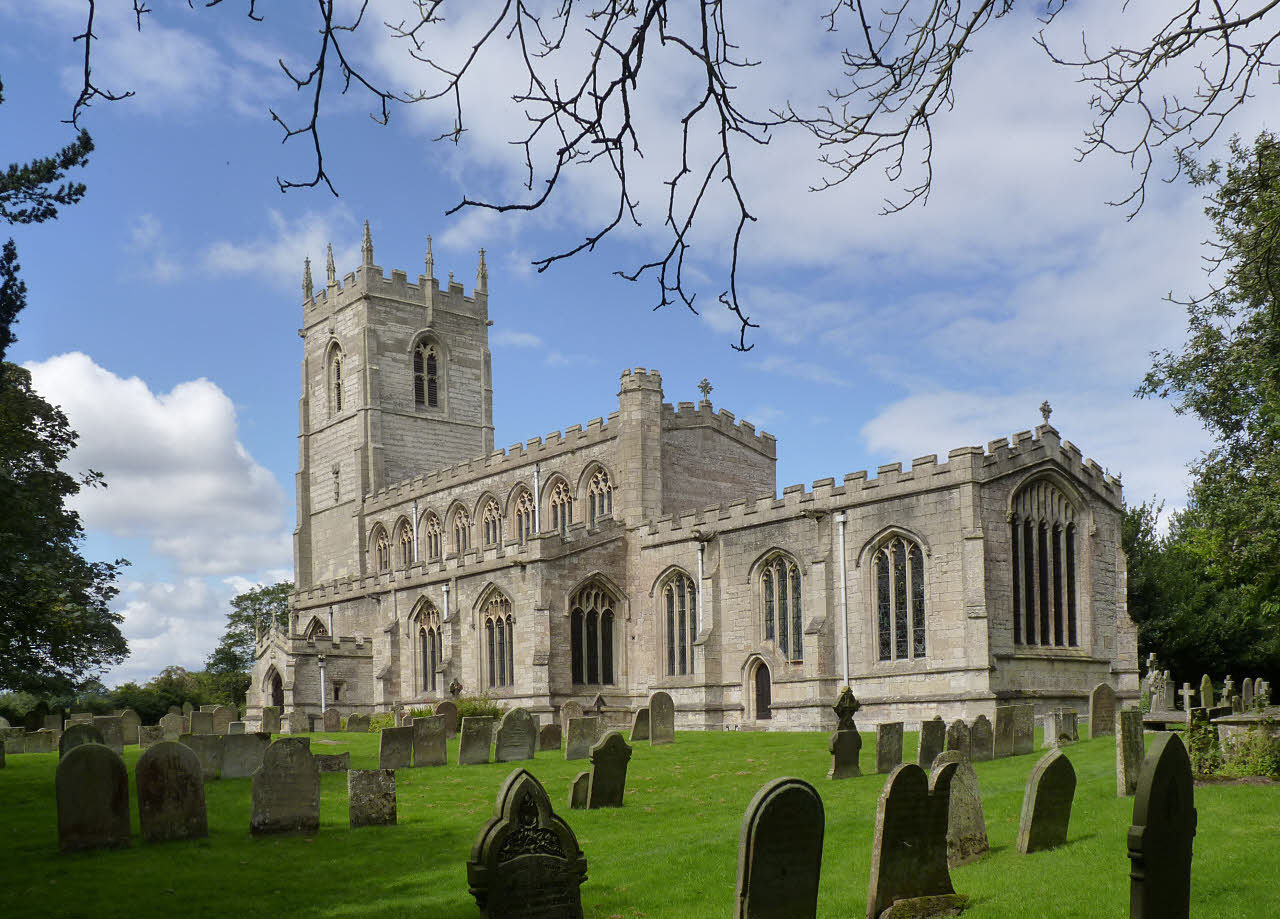
- Church of St John the Baptist

- Location within Nottinghamshire
- Interactive map of East Markham
- Area: 4.16 sq mi (10.8 km^{2})
- Population: 1,279 (2021)
  - Density: 307/sq mi (119/km^{2})
- OS grid reference: SK741731
  - London: 125 mi (201 km) SE
- District: Bassetlaw
- Shire county: Nottinghamshire
- Region: East Midlands
- Country: England
- Sovereign state: United Kingdom
- Post town: NEWARK
- Postcode district: NG22
- Dialling code: 01777
- Police: Nottinghamshire
- Fire: Nottinghamshire
- Ambulance: East Midlands
- UK Parliament: Newark
- Website: www.eastmarkham.org.uk

East Markham, historically also known as Great Markham, is a small village and civil parish near Tuxford, Nottinghamshire. The population of the civil parish taken at the 2011 Census was 1,160, and this increased to 1,279 in 2021.

== Geography ==
It lies about 5 miles (8 km) south of Retford. It is sandwiched between the East Coast Main Line (to the east), the A1 to the west and A57 to the north.

It has a sister village, West Markham, which is smaller and on the other side of the road (old A1-B1164) between Tuxford and Markham Moor. To the south is Tuxford.

The A57 East Markham bypass was to cost around £245,000 in 1972, being 1.25 miles (2.01 km). A public enquiry, on the bypass, was held in the village in late April 1973, and another enquiry was held in November 1974. It would cost £324,330 in August 1974. In December 1975 a contract was given for £440,000. It replaced a level crossing on the A57. Work began in January 1976, with the railway bridge built in April 1976, with British Rail paying for the bridge. The A57 bypass was planned to open in August 1976, but opened in late September 1976, being officially opened on 11 October 1976, five months early.

== History ==
East Markham contains Church of St. John the Baptist, village hall, a charity playgroup and a primary school. The post office closed in 1994 and after the village shop closed it re-opened with new owners in 2019. There is one remaining village pub, the Queens Hotel on High Street (the former A57). The second pub the Crown Inn closed down in approx. 2012 and was sold to developers who have turned it into a residential property. East Markham also features a playgroup, Pippins Pre-School, and a primary school. East Markham used to be home to some heavy manufacturing such as Hermans chicken factory and was historically known for its many orchards that used to surround the village, most of which closed in the 1980s (Hermans) or were replanted in the case of orchards. Small businesses which previously were physically present have now moved online including cake bakers and clothes retailers. The village also produces its own cider, by the name of Bad Apple.

Cleveland Mill was a tower windmill in East Markham, built in 1837 at a cost of £420 for the miller Thomas Lightfoot. It was 42 ft (13 m) high, with four storeys and four sails. The mill was worked by wind until c. 1920. Thereafter steam or oil engines were used. The mill was owned by the Lightfoot family through most of its working life. It was sold for conversion to a house in 1976.

== Amenities ==
East Markham church had a bell ringing group that practice regularly on a Tuesday night. In 2008, Brian Hardy, the group's Tower Captain, produced a guide detailing the rich history of the bells. Their first mention was recorded in 1552 when there were three bells.

Sporting facilities include a crown green bowling club, two tennis courts, a rugby league pitch which is home to Bassetlaw Bulldogs RLFC and a football pitch (which is home to East Markham FC). It also has a play area with a BMX track and outdoor gym equipment.

== See also ==
- Listed buildings in East Markham
