= Derby City RLFC =

English amateur rugby league club

Derby Elks

Club information
- Full name: Derby Elks Rugby League Football Club
- Colours: Green, Black and White
- Founded: 1990; 36 years ago

Current details
- Ground: The Stute, Ilkeston RUFC, Ilkeston
- Competition: Yorkshire Men's League Division 2

Derby Elks RLFC are an amateur rugby league club based in Ilkeston, Derbyshire, England. They were founded in 1990 and currently compete in the Yorkshire Men's League Division 2. They have been ground sharing with Ilkeston RUFC at The Stute since 2014.

== History ==
Derby City RLFC were founded in 1990 in the Blessington Carriage pub, Derby. Paul Crowe went on to become Derby's first coach and the first home games were played on the council pitch at Marketon Park. Early in its history the club nearly tasted success at St Ives, finishing a close second in the St Ives Sevens. Derby City went on to win the East Midlands Championship in season 1998/9 and in the summer of 1999 was invited to join the Northern Division of the fledgling Rugby League Conference.

Season 2000 saw the addition of Rotherham Giants to the division which resulted in 20 – 0 and 4 – 30 losses and Derby managed only the double over Crewe all season. The team also suffered the indignity of being held scoreless on four outings against Chester and Manchester and a record low of only 90 points for the season.

In 2001 John Beaman took over as head coach. Chester, Manchester and Rotherham still proved too tough to crack but cross Conference games against Sunderland and Kingston upon Thames together with old rivals Crewe were the highlights of the season despite providing the Wolves with their first ever double. The first serious work in schools began.

The club moved to the Asterdale for season 2002 and for the first time had players competing for positions. City still suffered its record loss of 72 – 0 to Rotherham. The team did however progress in the play-offs that year beating Newcastle Knights 44 – 26.

Dave Lawson took over as coach for the 2003 season. In 2003, with the expansion of the competition, Derby City moved to the North Midlands Division. Despite only three wins, Derby finally got the points against total below three hundred and finished with a difference of minus 87. The highlight of the season was the 38 – 30 defeat of Rotherham.

2004 Results started to come for the open age team with doubles over Worksop and Hillsborough Hawks and a best ever 5 wins in a season and only a tiny negative points difference. Anslem Robinson became Derby City’s first full international when he was chosen to represent the West Indies and a highly successful festival was held for junior schools in the city.

Derby started the season with wins against Mansfield, Thorne Moore and Sheffield to top the table for the first time. This was followed by a two-point loss to Lincoln but wins against Worksop, Rotherham and Mansfield kept City at the top after eight games and the Minor Premiers was clinched with a thrilling 23 – 21 win at Thorne. Unfortunately the hat trick against Thorne in the play-offs was just a step too far for the team and they lost 28 – 16.

Derby City moved up to the Midlands Premier division for season 2006 Nottingham were the team to beat in that season and Derby lost at home but gained a handsome win at Moderns. The season ended in mid table respectability with five wins out of 12.

City finished the 2007 season with six wins from 14. 2007 also saw the appointment of James Lewis as Community Sports Coach for Rugby League and the work in schools took on a whole new dimension.

In 2008 the Asterdale closed forcing a move of ground. Despite big things being expected with the move to the state of the art facilities at Derby Rugby Union, players melted away and Derby City withdrew mid-season from the Midlands Premier League but continued with junior development and fielding junior teams.

The club re-emerged in 2011 with a new management committee and new coaches coordinated by Grant Hunter. An influx of new players has also allowed Derby City to regularly field a merit team which competes in the Midlands Merit League. The Merit Team were losing Grand Finalists in 2014 and the First Team have reached the Grand Final each year from 2015.

In 2018 the club is still thriving in the Midlands Premier Division thanks to the commitment of team manager Jon Doughty and all the coaching team. The move to Ilkeston RUFC based at The Stute continues to prosper with the club supporting the Man of the Match award.

2021 saw the club being rebranded as Derby Elks Rugby League club, numbers have further increased allowing the club to field two sides through the 2021 Midlands season. The juniors section planned for relaunch in 2021/22 season. A new website www.derbyelksrlfc.com started in April 2021.

In 2022 the club entered the Yorkshire Men's League, where they are currently in YML Division Two as of 2026.

== Coaches of Derby Elks ==
| Coaches of Derby Elks RLFC | Season(s) as Coach |
|---|---|
| Ray Wilson | 1995 - 2000 |
| John Beaman | 2001–2002 |
| Dave Lawson | 2003–2005 |
| Lee Marsden | 2006 |
| Martyn Rothwell | 2007–2008 |
| James Turner | 2009-2011 |
| Grant Hunter | 2012 - |

== Juniors ==
Derby Elks's junior teams take part in the Midlands Junior League

== Club honours ==
- EMARLA Champions: 1998/9
- Merit League losing Grand Finalists 2014
- Midlands League losing Grand Finalists 2015
- Midlands League losing Grand Finalists 2016
- Midlands League Minor Premiers. Losing Grand Finalists 2017
