= North East Worcestershire Ravens =

Rugby club

Club information
- Founded: 2005

Current details
- Ground(s): Birmingham and Solihull bees RFC
- Competition: Rugby League Conference Midlands Premier

North East Worcestershire Ravens, also known as NEW Ravens, are a rugby league club based in Hopwood, Worcestershire. They play in the Midlands Premier division of the Rugby League Conference and Midlands Rugby League.

== History ==
Redditch Halcyons were formed in 1983. They played against the few teams that existed in the Midlands. Following the demise of the Halceyons and the introduction of the Midlands Conference, a new team evolved - the Worcester Saints. Worcester Saints became Worcestershire Saints after moving to Redditch in 1999. The Saints played in the Conference until 2004 when they folded.

Redditch Ravens were founded in 2005 from the ashes of the Worcestershire Saints. They joined the West Midlands Division of the Rugby League Conference. In its first season, the club played at Studley F.C. on the outskirts of Redditch. The club attracted players from many of the local rugby union clubs, as well as a number of players new to rugby league. The Ravens went on to lose all but one game, the lone victory came against Birmingham Bulldogs 30-24 and they finished bottom of the league.

The 2006 season saw the launch of the Ravens Academy introducing rugby league to junior players. By the end of the year a full-time development officer was in place for Redditch working in schools and with the club.

On the field, as the existing players became more experienced and new players joined the club, the results started to improve in the 2007 season. At one point the Ravens topped the league for three consecutive weeks. However, due to poor away form, they dropped down to finish mid-table with six victories.

Redditch joined the Rugby League Conference Midlands Premier for the 2009 season, however, they dropped out during the season and joined the Midlands Rugby League.

In 2010, Redditch linked up with Super League sides Warrington Wolves and Salford City Reds before moving to Bromsgrove RFC and adopting the name North East Worcestershire Ravens.

N.E.W Ravens have since moved grounds to Birmingham and Solihull bees RFC where they attracted some new players to the sport and won the league in their 2023 season. They continue to compete in the midlands merit league to current day

== Juniors ==
North East Worcestershire Ravens' junior teams take part in the Midlands Junior League.
