= Swindon St George =

English rugby league club, based in Swindon

Club information
- Full name: Swindon St George Rugby League Club
- Colours: Black/Red
- Founded: 2007; 19 years ago
- Website: https://www.pitchero.com/clubs/swindonstgeorge/

Current details
- Ground: Naglo Sports Club, Swindon
- Chairman: Richard White
- Coach: Kirk Collins
- Captain: Sam Danford
- Competition: West of England Rugby League

Swindon St George are a rugby league team playing in the West of England Rugby League.

The kit consists of black and red shirts with black shorts and socks.

== History ==
Swindon Bulldogs rugby league club existed from the 1980s until 1995. They played in the Midlands and South West Amateur Rugby League Association (MASWARLA) and the London League.

Former Bulldogs players got together to form the committee of a new club, Swindon St George, in late 2007. Swindon joined the West Midlands Division of the Rugby League Conference in 2008. In 2009, they competed in the London & South Division. In 2011, they competed in the West of England regional league losing in the final of the play-offs, after Michael Thompson scored 7 tries in their semi-final. They competed in the West of England regional Final once again in 2014, losing to Gloucester.

In 2016, Coventry Bears assistant coach; Ben Whincup, took over as head coach and led Swindon St. George to 3 consecutive grand finals in 2016; Losing to Portsmouth Seahawks. 2017; winning their first grand final against Oxford Cavaliers. And in 2018; losing to All Golds. In 2017 they launched their development squad known as “Swindon St. George A”

In 2019 they secured a place in the Southern Conference League and will play for the upcoming 2021 season. Due to the COVID-19 pandemic, the 2020 season has been called off by the RFL until further notice.
