= Lincoln City Knights =

UK rugby league team

Club information
- Full name: Lincoln City Knights Rugby League Club
- Website: www.freewebs.com/lincolncityknights/index.htm

Current details
- Competition: Rugby League Conference

Lincoln City Knights were a rugby league team based in Lincoln, Lincolnshire. They played in the Rugby League Conference.

== History ==
Lincoln City Knights joined the North Midlands Division of the Rugby League Conference in 2005. The division was rebranded the North Midlands & South Yorkshire Division for the 2006 season, merged into the Yorkshire & Lincolnshire division 2007, separated out as the South Yorkshire & Lincolnshire Division for the 2008 before reverting to the North Midlands in 2009. Another rebrand saw it become the Yorkshire Regional division in 2010. Lincoln City Knights struggled to raise a team on many occasions in the 2010 season and have since folded.
