= Birmingham Bulldogs =

English amateur rugby league club

- Bulldog

Club information
- Full name: Birmingham Bulldogs Rugby League Club
- Colours: Yellow, claret and white
- Founded: 1989; 37 years ago
- Website: www.pitchero.com/clubs/birminghambulldogsrlfc

Current details
- Ground: Billesley Common
- Competition: Midlands Rugby League Premier Division

Birmingham RLFC are a rugby league team based in Birmingham, United Kingdom. They play in the Midlands Premier division of the Rugby League Conference.

== History ==
Birmingham Bulldogs were founded in 1989. The club's first season was in 1989–90 in the Midlands and South West Amateur Rugby League Association (MASWARLA) competition; a runners-up spot in the Heart of England Nines was followed by a programme of fixtures against local rivals such as Redditch Halcyon and West Midlands Police. The season culminated in a nail-biting encounter against Redditch in the MASWARLA Cup Final in Stroud, Gloucestershire. Birmingham were edged out 12–8 with a try in the dying minutes.

In the 1990 - 91 season the team was reinforced by a number of rugby union recruits. The club won their first silverware with the MASWARLA Challenge Plate in a final played at Worcester RUFC. The 1991–92 season saw Birmingham just fail to retain the Challenge Plate against the West Midlands Police RLFC, despite retaining the core of the successful team from the previous season.

The side began to flourish in 1994/5, winning the Heart of England Nines trophy in 1995 and notching up a notable cup win over established Doncaster side Bentley-Yarborough in 1996. The 1995 - 96 season brought more success as Birmingham captured the East Midlands League title, were runners up in the League's Cup final, won the Brennan Trophy in most dramatic fashion, had their first ever win in the National Cup and then hosted the Yorkshire Cup holders Queens, from Leeds.

The Southern Conference was launched in 1997 and was aimed at areas relatively new to the game. Birmingham played in the very first fixture in this new competition away at Leicester Phoenix and scored the first ever points, a drop-goal from Tony Williams, and the first ever try, from James Brabin. The game eventually finished 36 –23 to Leicester but Birmingham went on to the play-offs after finishing second in the Central Division, behind Leicester. The semi-final saw Birmingham play the winners of the Eastern division, North London Skolars in London. Skolars took an 18-point lead before Birmingham came back and the game eventually finished with Skolars holding on to win the semi-final 18 – 16.

In 1998, Birmingham adopted the name Birmingham Bulls as they had a connection with the Super League side Bradford Bulls. They rebranded again in 2000 to become Birmingham Bulldogs to avoid a legal challenge by Birmingham Bulls American football team.

The 2000 Rugby league Conference season saw the club finish top of their division. They then went on to reach the quarter-finals of the competition where they were defeated 29-27 points by Rotherham Giants.

The 2003 season saw the club finish top of their division and after pay-off wins against Nottingham and Mansfield travelled to the semi-final against Carlisle Centurions. The Bulldogs eventually found their match in a Carlisle side and went down 44 – 2.

Following the success of the previous season the club applied to join National league 3 in 2004 and were successful. The club's first fixture in National League 3 was a repeat of the previous years semi-final with an away trip to Carlisle Centurions. The Bulldogs set down a marker for the rest of the season and scored a 30 – 20 win. This set the tone for the rest of the season and the Bulldogs eventually finished eighth and progressed to the play-offs where they were just pipped by Coventry Bears.

Midway through the 2005 season, the club had to withdraw from the competition and revert to playing in the Midlands Regional division of the Rugby League Conference. In 2006, the club re-established itself in the Rugby League Conference Midlands Premier Division.

Russell Parker was appointed as a full-time Community Rugby League Coach for Birmingham in 2007. This significant stride forward for the sport in the city matched equivalent appointments throughout the Midlands. Following the work in local schools a junior section was soon established at the club, with teams at various age groups competing at numerous festivals throughout the Midlands during the season. The club saw much improved performances during the season in the RLC Midlands Premier but missed out on the end of season play-offs.

Russell Parker's appointment as Senior Head Coach in 2008, the club's development continued with the formation of a second open-age team early in the RL Merit League which reached the semi-final play-offs where they narrowly lost to Sheffield Forgers. The club also worked hard behind the scenes at its development work and successfully applied for Clubmark status.

In a major close-season change, the club relocated from its Moor Lane home of many years to nearby Aston Old Edwardians rugby union in 2009. The club continued with two Open Age teams competing in the RLC Midlands Premier and the renamed Midlands Rugby League. The RLC Midlands competition came down to four teams competing for top spot in the final round of the season. In a 'winner takes all' clash against Coventry Bears, the Bulldogs lost narrowly to the eventual winners and missed out on the play-offs. The Bulldogs second team topped the Midlands Rugby League after the regular season. The club had its revenge against Coventry Bears in the semi-final to set up a final against North Derbyshire Chargers. Following an early deficit they fought back to win the game and win the club's first silverware since 1996. At junior level the Bulldogs competed at under-12, under-14 and under-16 in the newly established Midlands Junior League.

In 2010, the club linked up with Super League side Hull F.C.

== Juniors ==
Birmingham Bulldogs' junior teams take part in the Midlands Junior League.

== Club honours ==
- RLC Western Division: 2000
- RLC Midlands Division: 2003
- Midlands Rugby League: 2009

== See also ==
- Category:Birmingham Bulldogs riders
