= Herringthorpe Stadium =

Athletics stadium in Rotherham, South Yorkshire, England

Coordinates: 53.422397°N 1.332994°W

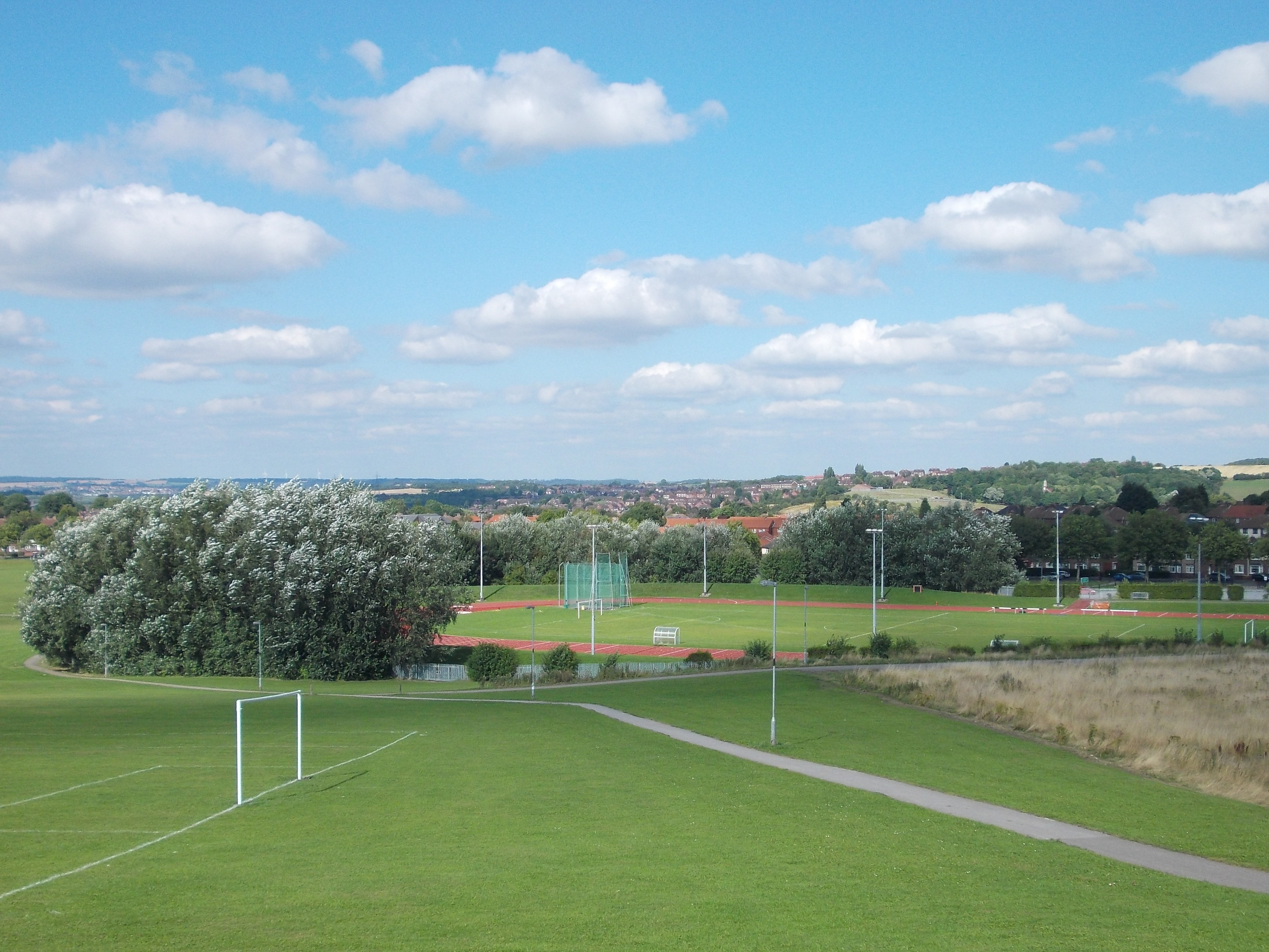
View from Broom Road

Herringthorpe Stadium is an athletics stadium in Rotherham, South Yorkshire, England. It contains a 400m, Olympic-class running track and grass pitch, as well as facilities for other Olympic disciplines such as discus nets. The stadium was the area's premier athletics venue until the English Institute of Sport opened in Sheffield in 2004. Rotherham Harriers athletics club are based at the stadium, which is the home ground of Rugby League Conference side Rotherham Giants, and it has also hosted Rotherham Titans rugby union games and school competitions. Rotherham United F.C. Women Under 21's play their home games at Herringthorpe in the 2025–26 season.

== Sources ==
- Herringthorpe Stadium
- Phorum :: Rotherham.tk :: Exeter game at Herringthorpe Stadium
- Rotherham PCT Internet Site
- Rotherham United Women U21 | Sheffield & Hallamshire Women & Girls League
