= Sheffield Forgers =

English amateur rugby league club

Club information
- Full name: Sheffield Forgers RLFC
- Colours: Purple with Gold
- Founded: 2004; 22 years ago as Sheffield IMBRL
- Website: https://www.sheffieldforgers.co.uk

Current details
- Ground: Westfield Sports Centre
- Competition: Yorkshire Men's League

Sheffield Forgers RLFC is a rugby league club in Sheffield, England. It has an Open Age team that plays in the summer in the Yorkshire Men's League.

The genesis of the club dates back to summer 2004, when a group of Sheffield Eagles supporters decided to try their hand at playing rather than just watching. As the team, called Sheffield IMBRL, was open to anyone the standard of players was unknown so the initial concept was to provide games against other supporters teams. These games were arranged via an Internet Message Board, hence Internet Message Board Rugby League.

== Ethos ==
The club is built on accessibility to rugby league regardless of race, age or gender. It runs open age contact and EuroTag teams as well as intending to run junior teams again in the near future.

== Season 2004 ==
Sheffield IMBRL 2004

The first-ever game for the club was played at Hillsborough Arena, home of the Hillsborough Hawks, against the Swinton Lions supporters. It ended in a narrow victory for the Lions 22–20. The game was short sided, full contact, and some Beagles guested for the Lions. The team then went on to play the Castleford Aybertigers at Castleford in a tag rather than contact game and they recorded their first ever victory on a baking hot August day. A heavy loss against the Hull FC Irregulars at The Boulevard was followed by a lesson in tag rugby at the annual IMBRL tournament. Despite these setbacks on the field, the concept had worked and was allowing new players to play rugby league as well as watching it, at a standard suitable for beginners.

The photograph shows the team for the first game against Swinton.

== Season 2005 ==
Sheffield Beagles v Hull FC Irregulars 2005

Having had to borrow kit in 2004, the team were boosted in 2005 by the donation of a Sheffield Eagles kit used in Mark Aston's testimonial. The club hosted a Tag 7s tournament at Hillsborough in May in which Aston and a number of other ex- and current Eagles players guested. The tournament ended in a drawn final between the Aston 7 and Sheffield RUFC. The team played Halifax, Hunslet, York, Chesterfield Spires and the Heavy Woollen Donkeys for the first time and also recorded their first win against the Hull FC Irregulars. Towards the end of the season the team won its first full contact game against the Chesterfield Spires and were semi-finalists at the IMBRL tournament in Hull. The club held its first awards evening and the general consensus was that the club was growing. During this season the nickname "Beagles", derived from 'B'-Eagles as a tribute to the professional club in the city, stuck and carried on as a nickname when the team moved under the Forgers banner in 2006.

== Season 2006 ==
Forgers v Scunthorpe Braves 2006

Season 2006 saw the first serious pre-season training for the new squad and the arrival of the first official kit bearing the Beagles logo. At this point the senior club members decided to put things on a more professional footing and to try to develop a proper club rather than just a team. This required a permanent home and a junior development program, neither of which interfered with the work being done by the city's other club, the Hillsborough Hawks. The venue chosen, All Saints Sports College, suited both these requirements as it was located in a school in the south east of the city. It also required a more appropriate name, so the Forgers was chosen as the club name. The first age group for the new Junior Forgers was a U13 team, who played and won their first-ever game against the Peterlee Pumas in January 2006.

The Open Age team, meanwhile, entered the newly formed Midlands Merit League and warmed up with a win over the Heavy Woollen Donkeys. They participated in the first-ever game in the league on 8 April 2006, beating their old rivals the Chesterfield Spires by 58 points to 8, with Greg Pursehouse scoring the Forgers first competitive try.

The club ran a second successful tag tournament in May, won by the London Griffins. May also saw the first match against overseas opposition when they beat Bretagne Nantes XIII by 24–22 at All Saints.

The Forgers went on tour for the first time in July 2006, going to the South of France where they played the Hull FC Irregulars. Both teams were also there to watch Hull F.C. play Catalans Dragons in the Super League.

== Season 2007 ==
The 2007 season was one of improvement for the open age team but less so for the juniors. After winning only one game in the 2006 MML, the Forgers went through the 2007 MML regular season unbeaten in 10 games, scoring over 500 points in the process. With a new coach at the helm, there were high hopes of success but the team went down 25–24 to the German Exiles in the championship semi-final.

The juniors entered the MML Under 15s league but with only one player at U15 and the rest at U14 it was difficult going and they failed to win any matches.

== Season 2008 ==
2008 saw the Forgers enter the Rugby League Conference on the back of their success in the Merit League the previous season, while continuing with a Merit League side. After struggling in their conference debut against the highly fancied Thorne Moor Marauders, the Forgers began to adapt to Conference life with several encouraging performances, and eventually recorded their first win on 21 June with a 32–18 victory over Scunthorpe Barbarians.

The Merit League side, featuring less experienced players, suffered a shock defeat in their opening game of the season but finished in 4th place with 9 wins and 2 defeats. After a semi-final defeat to Moorends the team reached the shield final where they lost to Nottingham Outlaws.

In order to extend the competitive season, the club decided to enter the Pennine League in 2008/2009.

== Season 2009 ==
In 2009 the Forgers entered the Pennine League on the back of their success in the Rugby League Conference the previous season. The change to winter rugby took its toll on the club, losing vital players due to the change from summer to winter, resulting in the Merit League side effectively folding. In their division after a long hard season against the likes of Westgate Redoubt, New Earswick All-Blacks, Garforth Tigers and Wetherby Bulldogs amongst others (effectively very experienced sides that had been around 30+ years), the Forgers began to adapt to the Pennine leagues intensity with several encouraging performances and eventually recorded their first win on 30 November with a convincing 54–14 victory over Cowling Harlequins.

== Folding ==
Everything was looking good on the field after effectively turning the corner and raising to the intensity levels of the competition, however the situation off the field began to hit road blocks – namely that the ground being used at All-Saints was being redeveloped to accommodate the school, and as a result there was nowhere for the club to play out of. Coupled with that the departure of key personnel both on and off the field at the end of the season, the club suffered as a result and eventually folded.

== Life after Forgers ==
Many players went on to be successful elsewhere – either at other local clubs or in rugby union. The legacy of those players at Sheffield Forgers lived on, winning titles in both the Midlands League as players/coaches and doing well in rugby union. Regular "bash-up" games were played with the assistance of other clubs to get the Forgers alumni back together but without back-room staff there was never really an opportunity to push on and bring everyone back together as a Forgers outfit.

== Re-form ==
After nearly 8 years separated and after hearing the announcement of Sheffield Eagles coming back home to the city, conversations started to happen in the background between past Sheffield Forgers players and the possibility of re-forming was mooted. Since then, the club has re-formed firstly at Open-Age level, running two sides for various offerings – Both EuroTag and full-contact rugby league is offered.

== 2018 season ==
The 2018 season started out in earnest, with the sole focus of the club to aim to do what not very many (if at all any in the last few years) new clubs have done in the Yorkshire Men's League – complete all of their fixtures.

The formation of the club was met with a fair level of disbelief that the club would be a success but the club moved forward. It based its new home out of Westfield Sports Centre – a local Sports Centre on the South East side of Sheffield – in an effort to spread the games reach outside of the city.

This resulted in a rather successful first batch of recruitment, with many players coming to try for the first time or coming back to the game after growing disillusioned with the sport due to previous experiences elsewhere.

The club succeeded in completing all of its fixtures in its new maiden season despite an extensive injury list in its first year – also having its head coach win the Division 4 coach of the year award (despite not winning in its first season, but coming close) and being nominated for Yorkshire Men's League club of the year.

== 2019 season ==
The 2019 season so far has begun tentatively – the focus this year is to go from guaranteeing regular rugby for players to moving towards being more competitive.

Pre-season recruitment was considered stable, with a significant proportion of the club’s core players retained from the prior year despite a difficult first season. The club also added experienced signings and several new participants, alongside the appointment of additional support staff, resulting in a more balanced squad that was regarded as potentially competitive for the upcoming season.

The wait didn't need to be long to pick up the Forgers first win of the campaign – coming up just short 28–18 against Kirkburton Cougars situated 2 divisions above them in their first pre-season friendly, their second game against Midlands Premier Division opponents Derby City RLFC running out winners 42–30.

Time will tell whether the season is as competitive as initial results suggest, but the omens are looking good for the side so far.
