= Rotherham Giants =

English amateur rugby league club

Club information
- Full name: Rotherham Giants RLFC
- Founded: 2000; 26 years ago
- Website: www.pitchero.com/clubs/rotherhamgiants

Current details
- Ground: Herringthorpe Stadium
- Competition: Rugby League Conference Yorkshire Premier

Rotherham Giants was a rugby league team based in Rotherham, South Yorkshire, playing in the Yorkshire Premier of the Rugby League Conference. It played its home matches at Herringthorpe Stadium. Its A-team took part in the Yorkshire & Humber Merit League.

== History ==
Rotherham Giants joined the Northern Division of the Rugby League Conference in 2000 and won it in its second season. The club moved to the North Midlands Division in 2003 as the Conference expanded and new divisions were added. Rotherham left the Conference for the 2006 season and returned in 2008 joining the South Yorkshire & Lincolnshire Division.

The club folded in c. 2012.

== Club honours ==
- RLC Northern Division: 2001
