= Whitley Bay Barbarians =

English amateur rugby league club, based in Whitley Bay, Northumberland

Club information
- Full name: Whitley Bay Barbarians; Amateur Rugby League Football Club
- Colours: Royal blue, amber and white
- Founded: 1994; 31 years ago
- Website: www.wbbrl.com

Current details
- Ground(s): Whitley Bay High School, Deneholm, Whitley Bay, Tyne And Wear, NE25 9AS
- Competition: Rugby League Conference North East Division

Whitley Bay Barbarians are a rugby league team based in Whitley Bay, Tyne and Wear. They play in the North East Division of the Rugby League Conference.

== History ==
Whitley Bay Barbarians under-14s were formed in November 1994. The Barbarians under-9s were born a year later in 1995. The open age side was formed in 1996, after a reasonably successful run, Barbarians went through a difficult couple of years, only for the Barbarians Juniors to be reborn in 1999.

== Seniors ==
Whitley Bay Barbarians reformed their open age side and joined the newly created North East Division of the Rugby League Conference in the 2003 season.

Whitley joined the North Premier for the 2007 and 2008 summer seasons, but in 2009 the North Premier was divided into the North West Premier and the Yorkshire Premier and the Barbarians joined the North East Division again. Then in 2011 the North East League was split into two, Regional and Premier, which the Barbarians entered the RLC North East regional division.

In 2014 the seniors were league winners recording 8 wins, 1 draw and only 1 defeat. They then went on to beat Gateshead Storm A in the Divisional Grand final to be crowned champions. 2015 once again saw the senior team win the league and playoffs. They finished the season with 10 wins and 2 losses. They also made it to the North East Cup final where they were defeated by Wallsend Eagles.

== Women's team ==
In 2016, the women's team reached the final of the Challenge Shield and in doing so became the first North East side to appear in a Rugby Football League women's final. In 2017, they took part in the Challenge Cup and reached the semi-finals of the Shield.

== Juniors ==
Whitley Bay Barbarians' junior teams take part in the North East Junior League at under-10s, 12s, 14s and under-16s.

== Honours ==
- 2014 - North East Rugby League Division 1 League Leaders and Play-off winners.
- 2015- North East Rugby League Division 1 League Leaders and Play-off winners. North East Cup Runners-up.
