= Newcastle rugby league team (disambiguation) =

Newcastle rugby league team may refer to the following rugby league teams from:

- Newcastle, New South Wales:
  - Newcastle rugby league team, a representative team made up of players from Newcastle Rugby League clubs.
  - Newcastle Knights, a club established in 1988 that competes in the National Rugby League
  - Newcastle Rebels, a club established in 1908 that competed in Sydney's NSWRFL Premiership
- Newcastle upon Tyne:
  - Newcastle Storm, a club established in 2010 that competes in the Rugby League Conference North East Division
  - Newcastle RLFC, a club established in 1938 that competed in the Rugby Football League Championship
