= St Ives Roosters =

English amateur rugby league club

- Rooster

Club information
- Full name: St Ives Roosters ARLFC
- Colours: Red and white hoops
- Founded: 1991; 35 years ago
- Website: www.stivesroosters.co.uk

Current details
- Ground: Somersham Road, on the edge of St Ives
- Competition: Rugby League Conference East Division

St Ives Roosters are a rugby league club from St Ives in Cambridgeshire. They were founded in 1991 as one of the first rugby league clubs in East Anglia. Currently they play in the Rugby League Conference East Division.

== History ==
The club were founded in 1991 as St Ives Sharks. Their first game was against Newmarket at the St Ivo Outdoor Centre. It was a friendly fixture with both clubs having very little experience in their sides. The Sharks won 56-8 . The club then joined the Eastern Counties League.

After the brief Shark era, the club relocated in the 1995 / 6 season to Huntingdon and thus were renamed Huntingdon Bombers. In 1995–96, the Eastern Counties League was absorbed into the London League and were also crowned Champions in that year, finishing the season unbeaten. Between 1991 and 2001, Dan McCormack was the top-points scorer with a total of 486 points broken down into 40 tries and 43 goals.

Eventually in 2001 they returned to St Ives after sorting out agreements with the ground and fixtures with the local rugby union club .

In 2003 the first team moved up to the Rugby League Conference from the London League. After being requested to adopt a nickname "Roosters" was chosen after a competition in The Huntingdon Post . They have been in the Rugby League Conference ever since.

In 2005, Roosters made it to the RLC Shield final at the Butts Park Arena, Coventry where they played Blackpool Sea Eagles with Blackpool running out 74 - 10 winners. St Ives made to the regional grand final in 2006 but were beaten by Bedford Tigers.

St Ives Roosters returned to the St Ivo Outdoor Sports Centre for the 2011 season as St Ives rugby union club was unavailable due to refurbishment works taking place.

St.Ives Roosters have enjoyed many successful seasons at California Road. After their fifth successive Grand Final appearance in 2014, they finally lifted the trophy after beating Bedford Tigers, 42–30.

Coach Paul Ashbridge works hard to keep the club running and is backed up by Roosters captain, Mickey Blackley. They continue to move the club forwards so they're able to compete at the highest level possible.

== Leagues ==
- 1991-1994: Eastern Counties League
- 1995-2002: London League
- 2003-2008: Rugby League Conference
