= Wallsend Eagles =

English amateur rugby league club, based in Wallsend, Tyneside

Wallsend Eagles RLFC
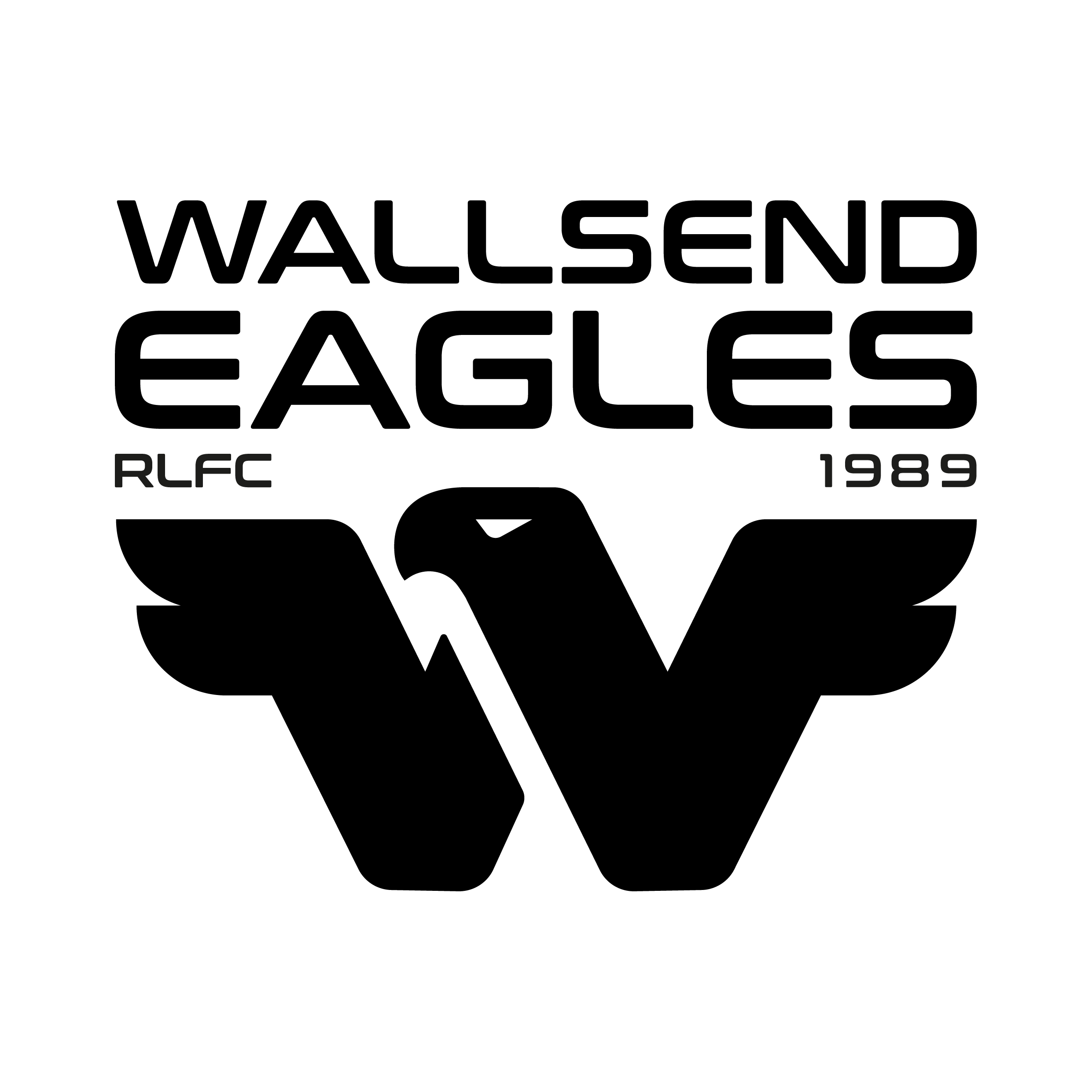

Club information
- Full name: Wallsend Eagles RLFC
- Nickname: Weagles
- Colours: Black / Purple / White
- Founded: 1989; 37 years ago
- Website: Official Website

Current details
- Ground: St. Peters Field
- Chairman: Keith Christie
- Coach: Adam Hay
- Captain: Liam Climpson
- Competition: Rugby League Conference North East Premier

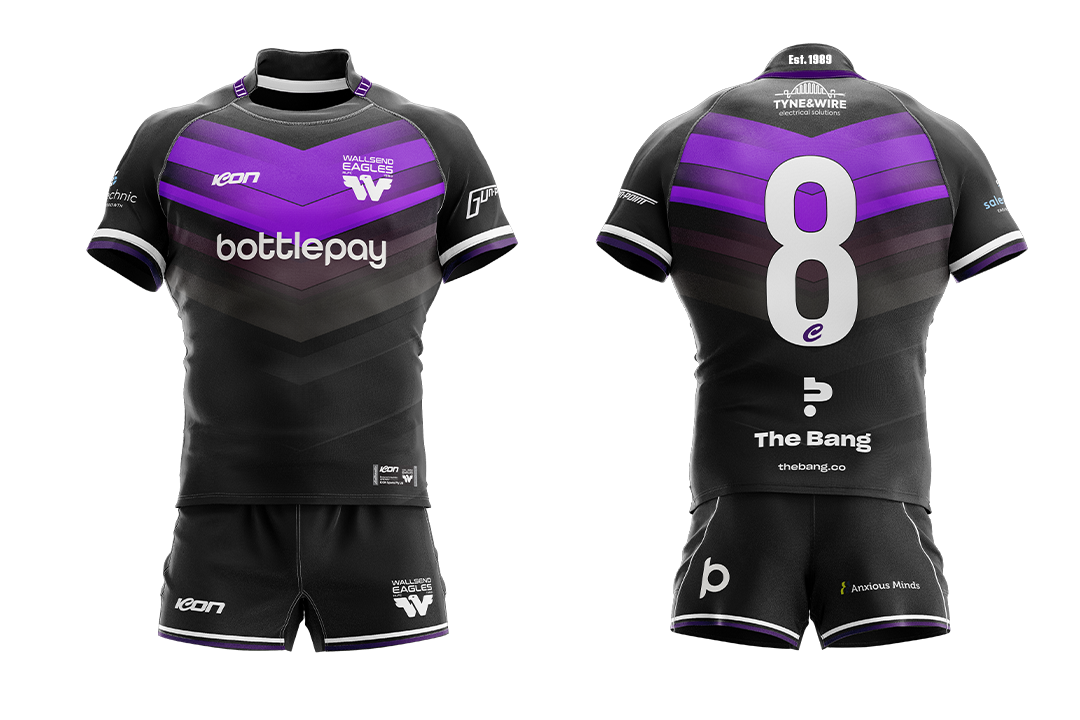
First Team Strip 2021-22

Wallsend Eagles are a rugby league side based in Wallsend, Newcastle Upon Tyne. The club runs five teams: open-age who play in the Rugby League Conference North East Premier; under-12s, under-14s and under-16s who all play in the North East Junior League and under-10s who play friendlies.

== History ==
Newcastle Eagles were founded in 1989 and were based at Western Middle school in Wallsend, North Tyneside. 1998 saw the club close down with lack of players until 2001 when a chance meeting brought Steve Walmsley into contact with Phyllis Thorman and Jan Neighbour. Walmsley was looking for a new challenge after aiding Killingworth Rockets' coach. Soon after, with the help of Phyllis and Jan, he began looking for new players for the Eagles.

News of the resurrected club team spread and within weeks there was renewed interest. The new Eagles team went on to play teams such as Sunderland City, Whitley Bay Barbarians, Shiney Row Sharks and Gateshead Panthers. Within the first year of starting up again Newcastle Eagles won the league. By 2005 there were two teams.

Newcastle Eagles continued to train and play games at Western Middle School until the building was demolished in 2006. The Eagles then re-located to Wallsend Sports Centre. By 2007 the club had expanded to three teams and Tony Kelly arrived as coach.

In 2008 the club committee decided to change the name of the team from Newcastle Eagles to Wallsend Eagles. It was thought that the new name would reflect on the huge local talent that came out of Wallsend. It was also this year that the Eagles moved to their new home at Benfield sports centre. By 2009, the Eagles consisted of four age group teams and also saw the Eagles under-16s venture into the Yorkshire league where they finished mid-table. In 2010, the open-age team joined the North East division of the Rugby League Conference. Eagles joined the newly formed North East Premier in 2011.

in 2015 the club fielded two open age teams for the first time in its history with Wallsend Eagles A team coming runners up in North East Division 2 and the first XIII dominating the North East Premier, winning the league, grand final and the North East Cup.

== Club Honours ==
- 2019 Challenge Cup First Round
- 2018 Challenge Cup First Round
- 2018 North East Premier Grand Final Champions
- 2018 North East Premier League Winners
- 2018 North East Premier Cup Winners
- 2017 North East Premier Grand Final Champions
- 2017 North East Premier League Winners
- 2016 North East Premier Grand Finalists
- 2015 Harry Jepson Trophy Semi Finalists
- 2015 North East Premier Grand Final Champions
- 2015 North East Premier League Winners
- 2015 North East Premier Cup Winners
- 2010 North East Premier Plate Finalists
