= Peterlee Pumas =

English amateur rugby league club

Club information
- Full name: Peterlee Pumas ARLFC
- Founded: 2002; 24 years ago
- Website: www.peterleepumas-rlfc.com

Current details
- Ground: Helford Road, Peterlee
- Competition: Rugby League Conference North East Premier

Peterlee Pumas are a rugby league team based in Peterlee, County Durham. They play in the North East Premier of the Rugby League Conference.

== History ==
Peterlee Pumas was formed in association with Durham Rugby League Service Area and the Rugby League Development Program. They started training in summer of 2002 and the open age men's team played friendlies in the first year before joining the North East division of the Rugby League Conference in 2004 getting through to the North East final and gaining promotion to the new North Premier. The club achieved club mark status in 2004 and was presented with the award at half time at the Tri Nations Game between Great Britain and New Zealand.

In 2005 the Pumas were the only team from the North East of England to beat Cumbrian opposition, however, the following year they dropped down and rejoined the North East division.

Peterlee Pumas became the first rugby league club in the North East to achieve Clubmark Gold in 2009.

Pumas joined the newly formed North East Premier in 2011.

They were among nine clubs invited to join the National Conference League for the 2013 season.

== Club honours ==
- RLC North East Premier: 2011

== Notable former players ==
- Paul Wilkes – PR
- Dom Crosby – PR
- Ian Sibbit – SO
- Andy Shickell – PR
- Danny Allan – SO

== Juniors ==
Peterlee Pumas' junior teams take part in the North East Junior League as well as the Yorkshire league.
