= Anglian Vipers =

Amateur rugby league club in Norfolk, England

Anglian Vipers are an English amateur rugby league club based in Wymondham, Norfolk who compete in the East Rugby League Premier Division, in the fifth tier of the British rugby league system.

The men's team was formed in 2022 and women's team in 2023. The club play and train at Wymondham Rugby Union Football Club but are independent of them. The men's team finished as runners-up in the 2023 season and won it in 2024, beating Hemel Stags 50–10 in the final in front of around 400 spectators.

The club made national news in 2024 after it was announced they were in talks with the Rugby Football League (RFL) about joining the professional structure beginning in RFL League 1 for 2025 in addition to making their women's team professional at a later date. Later in the same year, they signed former South Africa internationals Dylan Venter and Mike Mavovana. In July 2024 the club applied to join League 1 in the 2025 season, but were unsuccessful as the RFL approved the application submitted by Goole Vikings instead.
