= Cramlington Rockets =

English amateur rugby league club, based in Cramlington, Northumberland

Club information
- Full name: Cramlington Rockets RLFC
- Founded: 2000; 26 years ago
- Website: www.cramlingtonrockets.co.uk

Current details
- Ground: Cramlington Sporting Club
- Competition: Rugby League Conference North East Division

Cramlington Rockets are a rugby league team based in Cramlington, Northumberland. Recognised as one of the UK's leading clubs, they play in the North East Division of the Rugby League Conference.

== History ==
Initially, the club was the Killingworth Rockets ARLFC when it was formed by Steve Beaty in 2000 as a junior rugby league club. On the 8 September 2000, 12 lads turned out on the muddy field behind George Stephenson High School for Killingworth Rockets' first ever training session. Less than a year later they took part in a knock-out tournament for teams from Scotland and the North East of England, winning the competition and taking the "Calcutta Cup." This was the first of four cup championships over the next few years, during which time nine of their players won county caps. By 2003, however, there were difficulties in recruiting news youths to fill the under-12s and under-11s as the original players grew up.

The year 2006 saw a turnaround in this trend when, under the direction now of Steven Beaty and his son Matthew Beaty, the under-11 team finished in second place in the North East Junior League and were runners-up in the North East cup. A 10-year development plan was put into place to ensure that the club would not encounter such difficulties in the future. That same year, the club took back-to-back North East Junior League titles, becoming the first ever team to do so.

In March 2009, the club both moved to a new location and took a new name, the Cramlington Rockets RLFC. The move from North Tyneside to Northumberland came due to big interest shown during coaching sessions in local schools. The move resulted in player numbers almost doubling and the Rockets expanded to include under-8, under-10 and under-12 teams.

Cramlington Rockets formed their first ever open-age side in 2010 and joined the RLC North East Division. Led by Andy Stanton, the team finished 6th in their first season. In the 2011 season the RLC North East was split into Premier and regional divisions, Cramlington will take part in the regional division. Steven Beaty left Cramlington in 2011 to take up a rugby development role at Super League team Huddersfield Giants.

Returning in 2014, Beaty set about creating Rockets Community, offering activity in the style of a rugby league community such as school coaching and holiday camps.

The club quickly rose to be recognised as one of the UK's leading sporting club, winning the RFL National Club of the Year in 2017 in a ceremony at Old Trafford, Manchester before the Betfred Super League Grand Final.

The team at Cramlington were also behind the creation of Alnwick Bears RLFC in 2018, and Newcastle Magpies RLFC in 2019.

Rockets Community merged with the Newcastle Rugby Foundation in 2020, with the community engagement activity continuing under the Newcastle Thunder banner.

== Club honours ==
- North East League Regional Division: 2012
- North East League Under 15s Champions 2013

== Juniors ==
Cramlington Rockets' junior teams take part in the North East Junior League.
