= Milton Keynes Wolves RLFC =

UK rugby league team

Milton Keynes Wolves
Club information
- Full name: Milton Keynes Wolves Rugby League Football Club
- Nickname(s): MK; The Wolf Pack
- Short name: MK Wolves
- Colours: Red; White; Black
- Founded: 1 March 2012; 14 years ago
- Website: Official website

Current details
- Ground: Emerson Valley, Milton Keynes
- Competition: East RL Division One

MK Wolves are an amateur rugby league team based in Milton Keynes, Buckinghamshire. They compete in the East RL division of the RFL's Regional Leagues. They train at Emerson Valley Sports Pavilion which also serves as their home pitch, and is also home to Milton Keynes RUFC (MK RUFC). They are ranked club No. 153 by Pitchero.

== History ==
=== Background ===
MK Wolves were founded in early 2012. MK Wolves played home games at the Emerson Valley Sports Pavilion from their inaugural season until 2015. The Emerson Valley Sports Pavilion was also home to MK RUFC.

England and Wigan player Sam Tomkins, who was born in Milton Keynes, agreed to become honorary chairman.

=== 2012 ===
The Wolves' first match was an away friendly against Hemel Stags, on 25 April 2012, which MK lost 20–6. Their only try was scored by prop Ian Gray, with captain Scott Aspinall converting it.

MK Wolves' first competitive match was a home game at Emerson Valley against Bedford Tigers on 5 May 2012, which MK lost 24–40.

MK Wolves' debut competitive match lineup
Number	Player	Position
1	John Marchbank	Fullback
2	Kieran Perry	Right wing
3	Ian Umney	Right centre
4	Simon Read	Left centre
5	Kelvin Dwumfuo	Left wing
6	Chris Melly	Stand-off (or Five-eighth)
7	Scott Aspinall	Scrum-half (or Halfback)
8	Ian Grey	Prop
9	Mickey James	Hooker
10	Kieran McConnell (Capt.)	Prop
11	David Brown	Second row
12	Stuart Tomkinson	Second row
13	Phil Powell	Loose forward (or Lock)

East RL Premier Division 2012
Win	Draw	Loss	Position
1	1	8	6th

MK's first league points came in a 24–24 home draw against Kings Lynn Black Knights in July. The club won its first victory the following week, on 14 July 2012, beating the previously undefeated St. Ives Roosters 38–24. Head coach Gareth Edwards expressed his surprise in an MK News article, stating "I knew a win was coming, but honestly didn't expect it against the side who hadn't lost a game all season".

=== 2013 ===
East RL Premier Division 2013
Win	Draw	Loss	Position
2	0	6	4th

In 2013, MK Wolves welcomed Hemel Stags and former Ireland international player Wayne Kelly on board as coach. He was heavily involved in the club's pre-season preparations, however after sustaining a serious injury during a match for the Hemel Stags, Kelly decided to return to his native Northern Ireland with his family. The club then appointed Abe Kerr—a former Bedford Tigers and Hemel Stags player—in his place. He already had experience with the players, having previously led fitness training sessions.

MK Wolves unveiled a new kit using the colours of white, black and red.

After wins against Bedford Tigers and Kings Lynn Black Knights, MK Wolves qualified for the play-offs. They were beaten in the semi-finals by top-of-the-table—and eventual play-off winners—North Herts Crusaders. They also made it to the East RL Shield Final, where they were beaten by St Ives Roosters 38–16.

=== 2014 ===
East RL Premier Division 2014
Win	Draw	Loss	Position
3	0	7	5th

2014 began with a victory in the season-opening East RL 9's tournament—the club's first ever silverware.

MK Wolves secured a spot in the East RL Cup semi-final by defeating Cambridge Lions 54–4. Notably, Cambridge did not have any substitutes, with Wolves head coach Abe Kerr stating: "we really saw the benefit of ... a much larger squad allowing us to regularly rotate tired and injured players – a luxury Cambridge didn't have."

On 7 June 2014, MK Wolves overcame reigning champions North Herts Crusaders on their home pitch; the score was 26–12. It was the Crusaders' first loss in around two seasons.

At the inaugural 4-Counties Rugby League Tournament, an U16s inter-county tournament—with teams from Oxfordshire, Hampshire, Gloucestershire and Buckinghamshire—MK Wolves' U16s team represented Buckinghamshire. Ben Savage was nominated as man of the tournament for MK Wolves.

In the East RL Cup, MK Wolves lost in the semi-finals to Bedford Tigers.

The following week, in a match at Bedford, the game was overshadowed by an injury to player-coach Abe Kerr, which necessitated the summoning of the local Air Ambulance. He was flown to Bedford Hospital, where he was diagnosed with a concussion. MK Wolves went on to lose the match to the Bedford Tigers 48–10.

=== 2015 ===
In January 2015, before the start of the rugby league season, MK Wolves announced that their home ground would be moved to Manor Fields, in Bletchley.

A new coaching team was announced for the 2015 season: Jason Talbot, who was previously head coach of the Conference League South team at Bristol Sonics, and Mike Stewart, a former Super League player for Castleford Tigers, Batley Bulldogs, and the Dewsbury Rams. Stewart also captained the Scotland national team twice. Abe Kerr returned to his previous focus on player fitness.

Due to a lack of players, MK Wolves decided to drop from East Rugby League Premier Divison to East Entry League.

On 23 May, at their first home game at Manor Fields, and their first game in a grade below East Premier Division, MK Wolves lost to Bedford Tigers 32–40.

The following week, against Kings Lynn Black Knights on 30 May, MK Wolves lost 40–32.

=== 2016 ===
MK Wolves moved up to the East Division 1 competition in 2016.

The club's first points of the 2016 season came in a 36–36 draw against Southend Spartans on 21 May 2016 in Essex.

On 23 June, MK Wolves lost 26–12 to Kings Lynn Black Knights.

After Cambridge Lions forfeited, the club arranged to play a friendly match against Midlands South Premier Division team Northampton Demons. MK Wolves lost the match 64–30, but scored more points than any of their other games of the season. Additionally, Cambridge Lions' forfeit meant that MK Wolves trailed competition leaders Kings Lynn Black Knights by a single competition point, as did Southend Spartans. However, Southend had a points differential of 16, compared to MK Wolves' 14.

MK Wolves played their next game against Southend Spartans, and came back from an early 12–0 deficit to lead 20–16 at half time; MK Wolves won the match 38–28, sending them to the top of the table. Kings Lynn moved into second, Southend Spartans into third, and Cambridge Lions remained in fourth.

On 30 July, Kings Lynn forfeited, ensuring MK Wolves finished the regular season at the top of the table.

The grand final of the East Rugby League Division 1 was played on 20 August 2016, between MK Wolves and Southend Spartans. While Southend Spartans led 10–0 at half-time, MK Wolves came back to win 30–10. MK Wolves try-scorers included Stuart Tomkinson, Kai Muroi, Saope Sako, Dave Brown, and Ryan Eaton.

At the Player of the Year awards held later that night, the winners were:

- Young Player Of The Year: Ryan Eaton
- Most Improved: Munsukh Punian
- Players' Player: Scott Aspinall
- Man of Steel: Scott Aspinall

The full grand final squad was:

- Scott Aspinall (Capt.)
- Ryan Jordan
- Jordan Cummins
- Kelvin Dwumfuo
- Chris Melly
- Nathan Thomas
- Stuart Tomkinson
- Kai Muroi
- Ed Kilby
- Callum Moon
- Dave Brown
- Brian Purcell
- Stuart Bowers
- Ciaran Walter
- Nathan Hubert
- Saope Soko
- Dil Punian
- Munsukh Punian

=== 2017 ===
A friendly match on 16 April between Bedford Tigers and MK Wolves resulted in a 42–16 Bedford victory.

On 6 May, MK Wolves defeated Luton Vipers 34–32 after scoring and converting two last-minute tries.

In June, at MKRuggerfest, a rugby sevens festival, MK Wolves beat the Barbarians to win the Beer Drinkers tournament.

MK Wolves announced in August 2017 that they would be withdrawing from the East RL Division 1 competition, citing season-long issues and, particularly, miscommunications about the awarding of competition points.

== Honours ==
Club honours
League	Season	Team	Ref
East Rugby League 9's	2014	MK Wolves	
East Rugby League Division 1	2016/17	MK RLFC 1st Team	

Player honours – International
Player	Team	Ref
Wayne Kelly	Ireland	
Mike Stewart	Scotland	

== See also ==
- Rugby league in Great Britain and Ireland
- Rugby league in the United Kingdom
