= Sunderland City =

English amateur rugby league club, based in Sunderland, Tyne & Wear

Club information
- Full name: Sunderland Amateur Rugby League Football Club
- Colours: Home: red & white Away: black & orange
- Founded: 1980; 46 years ago
- Website: www.pitchero.com/clubs/sunderlandarlfc

Current details
- Ground: South Tyneside College
- Competition: Rugby League Conference North East Premier

Sunderland City are a rugby league team based in Sunderland, Tyne and Wear. They play in the North East Premier division of the Rugby League Conference.

== History ==
Sunderland City joined the newly created North East Division of the Rugby League Conference in the 2001 season.

They joined the new North Premier Division for 2005 but dropped down to the North Division in 2006 competing as Sunderland Nissan.

They re-entered the North Premier Division for the summer seasons of 2007 and 2008. However, in 2009, the North Premier Division split into the North West Premier and the Yorkshire Premier. Sunderland subsequently returned to the North East Division, reverting to Sunderland City.

Sunderland joined the newly formed North East Premier in 2011.
