= Mancunians RL =

English amateur rugby league club

Mancunians
- Shield

Club information
- Full name: Mancunians Rugby League and Handball Club
- Colours: Scarlet, gold and white
- Founded: 2 April 2009; 16 years ago
- Website: www.wearemancunians.com

Current details
- Ground: The Hough End Centre
- Competition: North West Men's League

Mancunians is Manchester's rugby league and sports club fielding several rugby and handball teams across the city at various age groups. The club is a Sports Club Community Mutual (Co-operative) and carries out development work across the city of Manchester.

The club submitted an expression of interest to the Rugby Football League to join Championship 1 in 2009 and are working with the Rugby Football League to develop their application further.

== History ==
Mancunians RL was formed on 2 April 2009 and joined the RL Merit League. In their inaugural season they were able to field two full teams on several occasions due to the sheer numbers of players interested in the club. The club were RL Merit Club of the year in 2009.

The club joined the Rugby League Conference in 2010 and were crowned regional champions at the first attempt and were promoted to the North West Premier division of the Rugby League Conference for 2011.

Mancunians RL announced a partnership between Manchester College, the Rugby Football League and Manchester City Council, to fund a full-time community coach to begin to increase participation in rugby league in Manchester.

Manchester College began offering a rugby league academy in 2012, giving young people in Manchester the opportunity to study rugby league on a full-time basis and secure coaching and sports science qualifications, whilst also representing the college and the city at rugby league.

Mancunians Handball was launched in 2012, with the club running several Handball after school clubs across the city.

The club was reconstituted to a community benefit society (cooperative) in May 2012 in line with other successful sports clubs including FC Barcelona, FC United of Manchester, Rochdale Hornets, Bramley Buffaloes and Hunslet Hawks.

In 2013 Mancunians launched a rugby league coaching scholarship in partnership Manchester Metropolitan University.

On 12 November 2013, Mancunians held Manchester's largest ever schools rugby league tournament at Parrs Wood High School. Over 100 schools pupils took pay with several Australian Kangaroos mentoring the sides and presenting the winning side Wright Robinson college with the Mancunians Year 10 rugby league tournament trophy.

On 15 November 2013 Mancunians launched a 13- to 16-year-old Rugby League Academy at Parrs Wood High School, Didsbury.

In March 2015 the club announced their 20:20 Vision to have 1,000 participants across Manchester involved in the club by the year 2020.

In November 2015 they began to offer wheelchair rugby for adults and children.

In January 2016 Mancunians announced that they had expanded their geographical footprint to encompass five areas of Manchester due to demand from partner schools and community groups and would be creating new leagues in the sports that they offer.

== Club honours ==
- RLC North West: 2010
