= Rhyl Coasters =

Rugby league team based in Rhyl, Wales

Club information
- Colours: Red, white and black
- Founded: 2004

Current details
- Competition: Rugby League Conference

Rhyl Coasters is a rugby league team based in Rhyl, Denbighshire, Wales. They played in the Rugby League Conference.

== History ==
The original North Wales Coasters formed in 1989 and joined the nearest district association which was Widnes in England. They played in the North West Counties Division 5 with home games played in Llandudno. Their first game was against Bradford Northern supporters club. They later also played at Ysbyty Glan Clwyd, Bodelwyddan, Abergele Sports centre and Parc Eirias in Colwyn Bay. They disbanded in 1997.

The North Wales Coasters name was resurrected in 2004 and the new team joined the North West Division of the Rugby League Conference. A divisional reshuffle saw the Coasters taking part in the Cheshire Division in 2006. North Wales Coasters failed to complete the 2007 season.

The club returned to the Conference as Rhyl Coasters in 2008 and joined the North West Premier Division in 2009. They dropped out of the Rugby League Conference in 2010.

Rhyl Exiles were formed from the ashes of Rhyl Coasters. They won the North Wales 9s but pulled out of the proposed North Wales Championship.

== See also ==
- Rugby League in Wales
- Wales Rugby League
- List of rugby league clubs in Britain
