= North East Rugby League =

English rugby league competition

- Sport: Rugby league
- Formerly known as: Rugby League Conference North East Regional Division
- Instituted: 2001
- Country: England

The North East Rugby League is a summer rugby league competition for amateur teams in North East England. The competition was formed in 2001 as the RLC North East Regional. Following the 2012 restructure of amateur rugby league in Great Britain, it was renamed to the North East Rugby League.

== Position in Pyramid ==
- 1: Super League
- 2: Championship
- 3: League 1
- 4: National Conference League/Conference League South
- 5: North East Rugby League

== Participating teams by season ==
- 2005: Newcastle Knights, Durham Tigers, Club Catterick, Scarborough Pirates, Winlaton Vulcans, Whitley Bay Buccaneers
- 2010: Jarrow Vikings, Peterlee Pumas, Winlaton Warriors, Whitley Bay Barbarians, Sunderland Nissan, Newcastle Storm, Northallerton Stallions, Cramlington Rockets, Durham Demons, Wallsend Eagles
- 2011: Gateshead Spartans, Gateshead Storm, Jarrow Vikings, Peterlee Pumas, Sunderland City, Wallsend Eagles
- 2012: East Cumbria Crusaders, Gateshead Spartans, Gateshead Storm, Jarrow Vikings, Peterlee Pumas, Sunderland City, Wallsend Eagles
- 2013: Catterick Crusaders, Cramlington Rockets, Gateshead Storm, Jarrow Vikings, Sunderland City, Wallsend Eagles (Teesside Bulls failed to start the season and Miners failed to complete the season)
- 2015 Cramlington Rockets, Durham Demons, Jarrow Vikings, Peterlee Pumas, Wallsend Eagles (Darlington failed to complete the season)

== Winners ==
=== North East Rugby League Premier Division ===
- 2011 Peterlee Pumas
- 2012 Gateshead Storm
- 2013 Gateshead Storm
- 2014 Jarrow Vikings
- 2015 Wallsend Eagles

=== North East Cup ===
- 2013 Gateshead Storm
- 2014 Gateshead Storm
- 2015 Wallsend Eagles

=== North East Plate ===
- 2014 Cramlington Rockets
- 2015 Jarrow Vikings
