= East Rugby League =

- Founded: 1997; 29 years ago
- Country: England
- Number of clubs: 11
- Level on pyramid: 6
- Domestic cup: Community Challenge Cup
- Current champions: Bedford Tigers A

The East Rugby League is a summer rugby league competition for amateur teams from the East of England. The competition was formed in 1997 as one of the two founding divisions of the Rugby League Conference. It ended its time in the conference as the RLC East Regional before being known by its current name from 2012 with restructure of amateur rugby league in Great Britain.

== History ==
The Rugby League Conference was founded in 1997 as the Southern Conference, a 10-team pilot league for teams in the South of England and the English Midlands. The initial line-up of divisions included an Eastern Division and this has been a feature of the Conference ever since.

The Premier Divisions were set up in 2005 for teams who had achieved a certain playing standard and were able to travel further afield to find stronger opposition.

The Eastern Division became the East Division in 2009.

The RFL restructured the amateur rugby league in 2012 and the Eastern region became rebranded as East Rugby League.

The East Premier was set up for the 2013 season with an East Entry League below this for emerging clubs and second teams. 2013 was also the inaugural year for the East Cup. The competition operates for all tier four clubs in the Eastern Counties of England (Bedfordshire, Cambridgeshire, Essex, Hertfordshire, Norfolk and Suffolk).

In 2014, a new division between the Premier and Entry level was formed and named East Division 1. It provides a more structured level for teams who cannot compete with the standard of the established East Premier. Promotion and relegation between the two competitions began in 2015.

== Position in pyramid ==
- 1: Super League
- 2: Championship
- 3–5: National Community Rugby League
- East Premier League
- East Division 1
- East Entry League
- East Merit League

== Participating teams by season ==
=== Premier Division (1997–present) ===
==== RLC era (1997–2011) ====
- 1997: Bedford Swifts, Ipswich Rhinos, Kingston, North London Skolars, West London
- 1998: Bedford Swifts, Cambridge Eagles, Ipswich Rhinos, Northampton (failed to start season), South Norfolk Saints
- 1999: Bedford Swifts, Cambridge Eagles, Hemel Stags, Ipswich Rhinos, South Norfolk Saints
- 2000: Bedford Swifts, Cambridge Eagles, Hemel Stags, Ipswich Rhinos, South Norfolk Saints, St Albans Centurions
- 2001: Bedford Swifts, Cambridge Eagles, Ipswich Rhinos, South Norfolk Saints, St Albans Centurions
- 2002: Bedford Swifts, Cambridge Eagles, Ipswich Rhinos, Luton Vipers, St Albans Centurions
- 2003: Cambridge Eagles, Essex Eels, Ipswich Rhinos, Luton Vipers, South Norfolk Saints, St Ives Roosters
- 2004: Cambridge Eagles, Hemel Stags 'A', Ipswich Rhinos, Luton Vipers, Middlesex Lions, North London Skolars 'A', South Norfolk Saints, St Ives Roosters
- 2005: Bedford Tigers, Cambridge Eagles, Luton Vipers 'A', South Norfolk Saints, St Albans Centurions 'A', St Ives Roosters (Luton Vipers A failed to complete the season)
- 2006: Bedford Tigers, Cambridge Eagles, Colchester Romans, South Norfolk Saints, St Ives Roosters (Northampton failed to start the season)
- 2007: Bedford Tigers, Cambridge Eagles, Colchester Romans, Greenwich Admirals, St Ives Roosters, Thetford Titans
- 2008: Cambridge Eagles, Colchester Romans, Greenwich Admirals, Hainault Bulldogs, Northampton Casuals, St Ives Roosters, Thetford Titans
- 2009: Bury Titans, Cambridge Eagles, Colchester Romans, Hainault Bulldogs A, St Ives Roosters, Northampton Casuals, Norwich City Saxons (Cambridge Eagles and Hainault Bulldogs A failed to complete the season)
- 2010: Bedford Tigers, Bury Titans, Northampton Casuals, Norwich City Saxons, St Albans Centurions A, St Ives Roosters (St Albans Centurions A failed to complete the season)
- 2011: Bedford Tigers, Bury Titans, Northampton Demons A, Norwich City Saxons, St Ives Roosters, Sudbury Gladiators (Northampton Demons A and Norwich City Saxons failed to complete the season)

==== East RL era (2012–) ====
- 2012: Bedford Tigers, Bury Titans, King's Lynn Black Knights, Milton Keynes Wolves, North Herts Crusaders, St Ives Roosters
- 2013: Bedford Tigers, King's Lynn Black Knights, Milton Keynes Wolves, North Herts Crusaders, St Ives Roosters (Stowmarket Titans failed to complete the season)
- 2014: Bedford Tigers, King's Lynn Black Knights, Milton Keynes Wolves, North Herts Crusaders, Southend Spartans, St Ives Roosters
- 2015: Bedford Tigers, King's Lynn Black Knights, Milton Keynes Wolves, North Herts Crusaders, St Albans Centurions, St Ives Roosters
- 2016: Bedford Tigers, Brentwood Eels, Hemel Stags (community), NH Crusaders, St Albans Centurions, St Ives Roosters

=== East Division 1 (2014–2018) ===
- 2014: Bedford Tigers 'A', Brentwood Eels, Cambridge Lions, North Herts Crusaders 'A'

NB: Bovingdon Bulldogs failed to start the season and were replaced by North Herts Crusaders 'A'

- 2015: Brentwood Eels, Cambridge Lions, North Herts Knights, Southend Spartans
- 2016: Breckland Spartans, Cambridge Lions, King's Lynn Black Knights, MK Wolves, Southend Spartans

=== East Entry League (2013–2016) ===
- 2012: Bedford Tigers 'A', Hemel Stags 'A', North Herts Crusaders 'A', St Albans Centurions 'A'
- 2013: Bedford Tigers 'A', Cambridge Lions, North Herts Crusaders 'A', St Ives Roosters 'A', Wymondham Trojans
- 2014: Did not run (Bedford Tigers 'B', North Herts Crusaders 'A' and St Ives Roosters 'A' were scheduled to participate but North Herts Crusaders 'A' joined division 1 and the other 2 teams folded)
- 2015: Bedford Tigers 'A', Cambridge Lions 'A', Milton Keynes Wolves (after dropping out of premier division), St Albans Centurions 'A'

== Winners ==
Year	Premier Division	Division One	Entry League	Community Challenge Cup	Community Challenge Shield	Community Challenge Vase	9s	Women's Championship
1997	North London Skolars (now London Skolars)	—N/a	—N/a	—N/a	—N/a	—N/a	—N/a	—N/a
1998	South Norfolk Saints (now Bury Titans)	—N/a	—N/a	—N/a	—N/a	—N/a	—N/a	—N/a
1999	Ipswich Rhinos (now Eastern Rhinos)	—N/a	—N/a	—N/a	—N/a	—N/a	—N/a	—N/a
2000	Hemel Stags	—N/a	—N/a	—N/a	—N/a	—N/a	—N/a	—N/a
2001	Ipswich Rhinos (now Eastern Rhinos)	—N/a	—N/a	—N/a	—N/a	—N/a	—N/a	—N/a
2002	Luton Vipers	—N/a	—N/a	—N/a	—N/a	—N/a	—N/a	—N/a
2003	South Norfolk Saints (now Bury Titans)	—N/a	—N/a	—N/a	—N/a	—N/a	—N/a	—N/a
2004	Ipswich Rhinos (now Eastern Rhinos)	—N/a	—N/a	—N/a	—N/a	—N/a	—N/a	—N/a
2005	St Albans Centurions A	—N/a	—N/a	—N/a	—N/a	—N/a	—N/a	—N/a
2006	Bedford Tigers (beat St Ives Roosters)	—N/a	—N/a	—N/a	—N/a	—N/a	—N/a	—N/a
2007	Bedford Tigers (beat St Ives Roosters)	—N/a	—N/a	—N/a	—N/a	—N/a	—N/a	—N/a
2008	Hainault Bulldogs	—N/a	—N/a	—N/a	—N/a	—N/a	—N/a	—N/a
2009	Northampton Casuals (beat Bury Titans)	—N/a	—N/a	—N/a	—N/a	—N/a	—N/a	—N/a
2010	Northampton Demons	—N/a	—N/a	—N/a	—N/a	—N/a	—N/a	—N/a
2011	Sudbury Gladiators (beat Bury Titans)	—N/a	—N/a	—N/a	—N/a	—N/a	—N/a	—N/a
2012	North Herts Crusaders (beat St Ives Roosters)	—N/a	—N/a	—N/a	—N/a	—N/a	—N/a	—N/a
2013	North Herts Crusaders (beat St Ives Roosters)	—N/a	Bedford Tigers A	North Herts Crusaders (beat Bedford Tigers)	St Ives Roosers (beat MK Wolves)	—N/a	King's Lynn Black Knights	—N/a
2014	St Ives Roosters (beat Bedford Tigers)	Brentwood Eels	—N/a	North Herts Crusaders (beat Bedford Tigers)	King's Lynn Black Knights (beat Brentwood Eels)	—N/a	MK Wolves	—N/a
2015	Bedford Tigers (beat St Ives Roosters)	Brentwood Eels	Hemel Stags A	Bedford Tigers (beat King's Lynn Black Knights 46–4) - MOM Paul Ryder	St Ives Roosters (beat NH Crusaders)	Southend Spartans (beat NH Knights)	Bedford Tigers	—N/a
2016	Hemel Stags (beat Bedford Tigers)	MK Wolves	Bedford Tigers A	Bedford Tigers (beat Hemel Stags 22–16)	Brentwood Eels (beat NH Crusaders 32–26)	King's Lynn Black Knights (beat Eastern Rhinos A 36–16)	Bedford Tigers	—N/a
2017	Hemel Stags (beat Bedford Tigers)	Luton Vipers	—N/a	Bedford Tigers (St Albans Centurions 38–12)	NH Crusaders (beat Hemel Stags)	Luton Vipers (beat Hemel Stags A)	St Albans Centurions	—N/a
2018	North Herts Crusaders (beat Bedford Tigers)	North Herts Knights	—N/a	Bedford Tigers (NH Crusaders 24–14) - MOM Ollie Peters	St Ives Roosters (Southend Sharks unable to attend match)	—N/a	NH Crusaders	—N/a
2019	Brentwood Eels (beat St Ives Roosters 18–16)	—N/a	—N/a	St Albans Centurions (Brentwood Eels 30–28) - MOM Kristian Naylor	—N/a	—N/a	Bedford Tigers	—N/a
2020	Cancelled due to the COVID-19 pandemic			Cancelled due to the COVID-19 pandemic		—N/a	—N/a	—N/a
2021	Brentwood Eels (beat Bedford Tigers A 40–18)	—N/a	—N/a	—N/a	—N/a	—N/a	—N/a	—N/a
2022	St Albans Centurions (beat Bedford Tigers A)	—N/a	—N/a	—N/a	Canvey Knights (beat NH Knights) 22-18 (Player of the Match Brett Smith 'Canvey Knights')	—N/a	—N/a	—N/a
2023	Bedford Tigers A (beat Anglian Vipers 38–28) MOM Scott Aspinall	—N/a	—N/a	Bedford Tigers (beat Hemel Stags 54–20) - MOM Ryan Litchfield	—N/a	—N/a	—N/a	Bedford Tigers A (beat Anglian Vipers 20–18) MVP Zoe Booth
