= Gateshead Storm =

English amateur rugby league club

Club information
- Full name: Gateshead Storm Community Rugby League Club
- Colours: Blue and amber
- Founded: 2002; 24 years ago
- Website: Website

Current details
- Ground: Gateshead International Stadium

Gateshead Storm are an amateur rugby league club in the North East of England. They played in the NCL Division Three.

== History ==
=== Gateshead Storm ===
Gateshead Storm were formed in September 2002, many of the original squad having played together as part of the Gateshead Thunder Academy. To help prepare for the Rugby League Conference, the club agreed to help out Durham Tigers in the 2002 competition. Durham went on to make the play-offs that year.

Storm entered the North East Division of the Conference in 2003 and progressed to the play-offs. The success of the first year was recognised with the award of 'Club of the Year 2003'.

The start of the 2004 campaign saw the Gateshead side progress to the final of the RLC Challenge Cup, where they narrowly to London Skolars 34–38. When Teesside Steelers withdrew from National League Three with barely two weeks to go until the first game and Storm were invited to take their place.

In 2006, Winlaton Vulcans withdrew from the North East Division of the Rugby League Conference, Storm agreed to start a second team to fulfil as many of Winlaton’s fixtures as possible. Although things started well, a series of injuries to players caused pressure on the club’s limited resources and with the National League side taking precedence a number of fixtures at the end of the Conference season were sacrificed.

2008 saw Storm relocate to a new home at Bullocksteads Sports Ground in Newcastle. Along with the relocation, there was a change of personnel within the club with Rob Jones stepping down as head coach to take up a role as chairman and being replaced by John Coutts.

Gateshead Storm Juniors were formed in April 2009 on the back of the success of Joseph Swan School's under-12 team.

=== Newcastle Knights ===
Newcastle Knights joined the North East Division of the Rugby League Conference in 2001. They previously played in the winter North East Rugby League Association as Benfield Lions. Newcastle Knights merged with Gateshead Panthers before the season started. They won the North East Division in 2004.

They joined the North Premier Division in 2007 but stepped back to the North East Division in 2009.

=== Newcastle Storm ===
The two sides merged to become Newcastle Storm for the 2010 season in which they played in the North East division. Newcastle joined the newly formed North East Premier in 2011. The new side reverted to Gateshead Storm at the end of the 2011 season.

Gateshead Storm 2012

Head Coach Gareth Barron guided the Storm side to an impressive second-place finish in the North East Premier qualifying Gateshead for the North East Grand Final. Storm faced off against rivals Jarrow Vikings coming away with a 20–22 win and progressing to the National knockout competition. Storm travelled to Edinburgh Eagles in the first round which turned out to be a step too far Storm going down 36–20 to the Scottish champions.

Gateshead Storm 2013

During the 2013 pre-season Gateshead Storm head coach Gareth Barron relocated to London and ex-Gateshead Thunder prop forward Chris Parker was promoted to the head coach position of the Gateshead Storm open age side. He would combine this role with that of the U14s to ensure their continued progress.

In his first season in charge of Gateshead Storm Open Age Parker guided his side to the 2013 North East Premier League Leaders' Shield and were crowned 2013 North East Cup Winners with a 24–16 win over Jarrow Vikings. Parkers side were then winners again in the North East Grand Final with yet another win against Jarrow Vikings. Storm took the game 33–16 qualifying them for yet another Harry Jepson Trophy Campaign.

The Harry Jepson Trophy draw was kind to Storm with quarter final opponents Northampton Demons Academy withdrawing days before the fixture due to injuries and illness. Storm travelled to Normanton in Wakefield and played Telford Raiders in the semi-final emerging victorious 62–12. In the Harry Jepson Trophy Final Storm went down to South West London Chargers 28–22 ending their unbeaten season.

The club joined the National Conference League in 2015. They withdrew from the league in 2021.

== Juniors ==
Gateshead Storm run junior teams for 2022 at u8s,10s,12s,13s,14s,16s,

== Club honours ==
- Whitley Bay 9s Plate Winners: 2003
- RLC Challenge Cup Runners-Up: 2004
- North East Rugby League Premier Division: 2012, 2013
- North East Cup: 2013

== Club awards ==
- RLC Club of The Year 2003
- Gateshead Council Volunteer Of The Year 2010 (Rob Jones)
- Gateshead Council Sports Club Of The Year 2012
- Gateshead Council Sports Team Of The Year 2012 u15s
- Gateshead Council Sport Achiever Of The Year 2012 (Mick Jones)
- North East Young Player Of The Year 2012
- North East Junior Coach Of The Year 2012 u14s (Chris Parker)
- North East Junior Coach Of The Year 2012 u15s (Adam Houston)
- North East Open Age Coach Of The Year 2012 (Gareth Barron)
- North East Dream Team 7 Players Open Age
- North East Volunteer Of The Year 2012 (Mick Jones)
- Gateshead Storm 9s Winners U13s, u15s 2012
- Gateshead Storm Touch Rugby League Plate Winners 2012
- Gateshead Storm Open Age Help For Heroes 9s Winners 2012
- Gateshead Storm u13s North East Cup Winners 2012
- Gateshead Storm u15s League & Cup Runners Up 2012
- Club Mark Gold Club 2013
- North East Premier Player Of The Year 2013 (Reece Young)

== See also ==
- List of sports clubs inspired by others
