= 2015 Conference League South =

- League: Conference League South
- Teams: 9

2015 season
- Champions: Nottingham Outlaws
- League leaders: Valley Cougars
- Top point-scorer: Matthew Cummins 198
- Top try-scorer: Adrian Chaima 25

The 2015 Conference League South saw the competition increase to 10 clubs. The new clubs were Gloucestershire Warriors who were promoted from the West Of England Rugby League as champions, Torfaen Tigers who moved up from the South Wales Conference and two new clubs Raiders RL and Coventry Bears Reserves. Unfortunately on 10 April Bristol Sonics after postponing their first two games, announced that they would have to withdraw from the league due to player problems and drop down to the West Of England Rugby League. The league season ran from March to September. The teams would play each other home and away with the top four contesting the end of season play-offs to decide the champions

== Clubs ==
Club	Country	Ground	Coach
Coventry Bears Reserves	(England)	Xcel Leisure Centre	James Carter
Gloucestershire Warriors	(England)	Oxstalls Sports Park	Richard Jones
Leicester Storm	(England)	Brooksby Melton College	Dean Thomas
Nottingham Outlaws	(England)	Highfields Sports Ground	Joe Shepherd
Oxford Cavaliers	(England)	Brookes University Sports Centre	William Brewer
Raiders RL	(Wales)	Stebonheath Park	Jon Ellis
Sheffield Hallam Eagles	(England)	Sheffield Hallam University Sports Park	Adam Hughes
Torfaen Tigers	(Wales)	Kings Head Ground, Cwmbran	Jamie Williams
Valley Cougars	(Wales)	Treharris RFC	Dafydd Hellard

== League season ==
- 20 Jan - Gloucestershire Warriors appoint Gloucestershire All Golds player Richard Jones as their head coach for their debut season
- 2 Feb - Valley Cougars beat Leicester Storm 27-22 in the first round of the Ladbrokes Challenge Cup
- 9 Feb - Nottingham Outlaws are beaten heavily at home 4-50 by Blackbrook in the Ladbrokes Challenge Cup first round
- 14 Feb - Valley Cougars are knocked out of the Ladbrokes Challenge Cup by Oulton Raiders 48-0 in the second round
- 23 Mar - Opening round of matches sees wins for Gloucestershire Warriors, Leicester Storm, Sheffield Hallam Eagles and Raiders RL
- 30 Mar - Sheffield Hallam Eagles go top after winning 28-16 at Nottingham Outlaws
- 10 Apl - Bristol Sonics after postponing their opening two games announce that they will have to withdraw from the competition
- 13 Apl - Sheffield Hallam Eagles retain top spot with a 54-22 victory at home to new boys Raiders RL
- 20 Apl - Valley Cougars end Sheffield Hallam Eagles' unbeaten run in the league stretching back 741 days, 16-14 at Treharris RFC
- 27 Apl - Nottingham Outlaws defeat league leaders Coventry Bears Reserves 20-6
- 11 May - Valley Cougars beat Gloucestershire Warriors 44-10 scoring 28 unanswered second half points
- 18 May - Valley Cougars go top after coming from 0-12 down to beat Leicester Storm 32-24
- 1 Jun - Cougars remain top beating Raiders RL 34-16 in a classic Welsh derby, Torfaen Tigers pick up first win against Oxford Cavaliers
- 8 Jun - A crowd of 257 watch Torfaen Tigers beat former champions Sheffield Hallam Eagles and move off the foot of the table
- 22 Jun - Valley Cougars move four points clear of Coventry Bears Reserves following their 48-12 win in the top of the table clash
- 29 Jun - Leaders Valley Cougars beaten for the first time in nine matches as they went down 22-28 at Nottingham Outlaws
- 6 Jul - Coventry Bears Reserves moved up to second by beating Raiders RL, Valley Cougars remain top after winning at Sheffield
- 20 Jul - Nottingham Outlaws set new club and league record by beating Gloucestershire Warriors 102-6
- 27 Jul - In form Raiders RL beat third placed Nottingham Outlaws 35-20 to join race for the play-offs
- 3 Aug - Nottingham won a hugely important clash against play-off rivals Coventry
- 18 Aug - Coventry secure their top four place with a hard fought win at Torfaen Tigers ending the hosts play off hopes
- 24 Aug - Torfaen Tigers set new club and league record when beating Gloucestershire Warriors 110-6
- 2 Sep - Valley Cougars confirm top two finish after win against Oxford Cavaliers
- 7 Sep - Nottingham Outlaws confirmed as runners up after hard fought win at Leicester Storm 34-14
- 11 Sep - Valley Cougars reach Grand Final
- 14 Sep - Nottingham Outlaws power their way to the Grand Final beating Raiders RL 36-8
- 21 Sep - Nottingham Outlaws wrestled the Conference League South title away from holders Valley Cougars 39-16 at AFC Corsham in Bath.

== League table ==
Pos	Team	Pld	W	D	L	F	A	Pts
1	Valley Cougars	16	12	1	3	620	344	25
2	Nottingham Outlaws	16	12	0	4	654	299	24
3	Raiders RL	16	10	0	6	634	402	20
4	Coventry Bears Reserves	16	10	0	6	536	388	19
5	Sheffield Hallam Eagles	16	9	0	7	613	357	17
6	Torfaen Tigers	16	6	1	9	582	579	13
7	Gloucestershire Warriors	16	5	0	11	320	754	10
8	Leicester Storm	16	4	0	12	362	618	8
9	Oxford Cavaliers	16	3	0	13	284	864	6

1 point deducted-Coventry Bears Reserves and Sheffield Hallam Eagles

== Play-offs ==
Semi-final
1	Valley Cougars	24
4	Coventry Bears Reserves	0
2	Nottingham Outlaws	36
3	Raiders RL	8

Grand final
Valley Cougars	16
Nottingham Outlaws	39

== Grand final ==
Venue - AFC Corsham, Bath

Pts	Valley Cougars	No	Nottingham Outlaws	Pts
	Danyl Davies	1	Adam Cunliffe	1 try
	Lewis Phillips	2	Adrian Chaina	2 tries
1 try	Mike Hurley	3	Adam Simm	
	Scott Greggs	4	Jimmy Goodwin	2 tries
	Suliman Yousif	5	Jon Christie	1 try
	Lee Goddard	6	Dan Smith	4 goals
1 goal	Marcus Webb	7	Alex Whittle	
	Scott Giles	8	Chris Prime	
	Dean Higgs	9	Simon Morton	
	Gethin King	10	Joe Barton	
	Ethan Coombes	11	Garyn Ward	
	Lewis Wilkes	12	Oliver Dale	
	Scott Britton	13	George Strachan	1 try
1 goal	Ben Jones	sub	Oliver Crick	
1 try	Dafydd Hellard	sub	Will Ephraim	
1 try	Craig Lewis	sub	Paul Calland	1 goal, 1 field goal
	Adam Morgam	sub	Pat Crummay	

== Grand final mini report ==
Nottingham Outlaws lifted their first Conference League South title by beating holders the Valley Cougars at AFC Corsham in Bath 39-16. Ill discipline cost the Valley Cougars who at one point were down to ten men. By the half hour the Outlaws were 18-0 up thanks to tries by John Christie, Jimmy Goodwin and Adrian Chaima all scored a goal by Dan Smith but the holders hit back with two tries in the final five minutes through Craig Lewis and Mike Hurley the first converted by Ben Jones leaving the score 18-10 at half time. At the start of the second half the first Valley Cougars sin binning cost them an immediate try from George Strachan, again scored a goal by Smith. A second sin binning soon after led again to an immediate try for the Outlaws this time from Goodwin, his second try of the match, Smith on this occasion missing his first conversion to leave the score at 28-10. Amazingly while down to 10 men following another sin binning, player coach Dafydd Hellard scored and with a conversion from Marcus Webb the Valley Cougars reduced the arrears to 12 points. But the lack of numbers eventually made the difference as Nottingham scored two more tries through Chaima, his second, and Adam Cunliffe. Player coach Paul Calland kicking one conversion to go with his field goal

== Results ==
Teams	Cov	Glou	Leic	Nott	Oxf	Raid	Sheff	Torf	Vall
Coventry Bears Reserves	x	0-24	62-18	16-28	72-0	32-24	32-20	56-26	20-68
Gloucestershire Warriors	10-56	x	26-32	24-20	46-22	0-84	10-54	12-40	20-62
Leicester Storm	22-36	32-26	x	18-47	20-26	22-30	4-62	28-16	24-32
Nottingham Outlaws	20-6	102-6	34-14	x	68-8	44-20	16-28	86-20	28-22
Oxford Cavaliers	6-50	12-56	42-44	4-56	x	36-28	10-58	40-36	26-48
Raiders RL	24-30	84-20	45-24	35-20	78-18	x	38-22	34-26	34-6
Sheffield Hallam Eagles	24-12	0-24	50-32	16-23	76-12	54-22	x	71-4	38-54
Torfaen Tigers	26-44	110-6	56-28	42-32	56-22	14-28	48-26	x	24-28
Valley Cougars	48-12	44-10	28-0	20-30	72-0	34-26	16-14	38-38	x

== Player statistics ==
=== Top try scorers ===
Pos	Player	Team	Tries
1	Adrian Chaima	Nottingham Outlaws	25
2	Matthew Cummins	Torfaen Tigers	19
3	James Goodwin	Nottingham Outlaws	16
3	Donald Kudangirana	Sheffield Hallam Eagles	16
5	Daniel Fox	Raiders RL	15

=== Top goal kicker ===
Pos	Player	Team	Goals
1	Matthew Cummins	Torfaen Tigers	61
2	Daniel Smith	Nottingham Outlaws	58
3	Kieran Smith	Sheffield Hallam Eagles	41
4	Luke Williams	Raiders RL	36
5	Alex King	Raiders RL	34
5	Lewis Chapman	Leicester Storm	34

=== Top point scorer ===
Pos	Player	Team	Points
1	Matthew Cummins	Torfaen Tigers	198
2	Daniel Smith	Nottingham Outlaws	136
3	Alex King	Raiders RL	108
4	Adrian Chaina	Nottingham Outlaws	100
5	Kieran Smith	Sheffield Hallam Eagles	90

== Sources ==
- statistics
