= 2014 Conference League South =

- League: Conference League South
- Teams: 6

2015 season
- Champions: Valley Cougars
- League leaders: Sheffield Hallam Eagles
- Top point-scorer(s): Thomas Holt 118
- Top try-scorer(s): James Goodwin 20

The 2014 Conference League South season saw two teams leave, St Albans Centurions dropped down to the South Premier while Northampton Demons returned to the Midlands Rugby League Premier Division. Replacing them were Oxford Cavaliers who moved up from the West of England Rugby League and Merthyr based Valley Cougars who rose from the South Wales Conference. The season ran from April to September. The teams would play each other three times during the regular season with the top four then contesting the play-offs

== Clubs ==
Club	Country	Ground	Coach
Bristol Sonics	(England)	Landseer Avenue	Aran Simm
Leicester Storm	(England)	Brooksby Melton College	Dean Thomas
Nottingham Outlaws	(England)	Highfields Sports Ground	Joe Shepherd
Oxford Cavaliers	(England)	Brookes University Sports Centre	William Brewer
Sheffield Hallam Eagles	(England)	Sheffield Hallam University Sports Park	Ged Corcoran
Valley Cougars	(Wales)	Treharris RFC	Paul Emanuelli

== League table ==
Pos	Team	Pld	W	D	L	F	A	Pts
1	Sheffield Hallam Eagles	15	15	0	0	749	210	30
2	Valley Cougars	15	10	0	5	452	446	20
3	Nottingham Outlaws	15	9	0	6	506	320	18
4	Leicester Storm	15	4	0	11	396	437	8
5	Oxford Cavaliers	15	4	0	11	268	508	8
6	Bristol Sonics	15	3	0	12	254	704	6

== Play-offs ==
Semi-Final
1	Sheffield Hallam Eagles	56
4	Leicester Storm	10
2	Valley Cougars	26
3	Nottingham Outlaws	12

Grand Final
Sheffield Hallam Eagles	10
Valley Cougars	19

== Grand final ==
Venue - Litchfield RU

Pts	Sheffield Hallam Eagles	No	Valley Cougars	Pts
1 try	Mitch Vincent	1	Lee Goddard	
	Darren Forde	2	Danyl Davies	1 try
	Thomas Ashton	3	Darryl Carter	
	Eddie Medforth	4	Dafydd Hellard	
1 try	Jordan Parry	5	Kevin James	
1 goal	Jack Mitchell	6	Paul Emanuelli	3 goals, 1 field goal
	Tom Holt	7	Mike Hurley	
	Marcus Stock	8	Gareth Way	
	Scott Smith	9	Zak Williams	1 try
	Connor Scott	10	Adam Morgan	
	Alex Palmer	11	Chris Speck	
	Santino Decaro	12	Gethin King	
	Jono Burns	13	Scott Britton	
	Jose Kenga	sub	Mikey Rowe	1 try
	Alex Hobson	sub	Steven Bray	
	Shaun Roberts	sub	Rhodri Morris	
	Matthew Bloomer	sub	Louis Jones	

== Results ==
Teams	Bris	Leic	Nott	Oxf	Sheff	Vall
Bristol Sonics	x	30-24	12-44 / 6-76	46-18	14-46 / 0-60	18-48
Leicester Storm	46-16 / 82-22	x	12-30	44-30 / 24-0	24-26	16-30
Nottingham Outlaws	48-14	20-18 / 46-20	x	10-28	24-46 / 20-44	50-12 / 22-24
Oxford Cavaliers	44-18 / 0-24	20-18	16-58 / 0-24	x	20-44	46-26 / 0-24
Sheffield Hallam Eagles	66-4	40-12 / 57-20	26-24	80-18 / 24-0	x	120-6 / 34-20
Valley Cougars	50-14 / 52-16	28-18 / 42-18	42-10	44-28	4-36	x

== Player statistics ==
=== Top Try Scorer ===
Pos	Player	Team	Tries
1	James Goodwin	Nottingham Outlaws	20
2	Wesley Newton	Oxford Cavaliers	14
3	Donald Kudangirana	Sheffield Hallam Eagles	11
4	Scott Smith	Sheffield Hallam Eagles	10
5	Danyl Davies	Valley Cougars	8

=== Top Goal Kicker ===
Pos	Player	Team	Goals
1	Thomas Holt	Sheffield Hallam Eagles	49
2	Jonathon Shields	Nottingham Outlaws	45
3	Andrew Winfield	Oxford Cavaliers	23
4	Oliver Furniss	Leicester Storm	22
5	Calum Butler	Sheffield Hallam Eagles	14

=== Top Point Scorer ===
Pos	Player	Team	Points
1	Thomas Holt	Sheffield Hallam Eagles	118
2	Jonathon Shields	Nottingham Outlaws	110
3	James Goodwin	Nottingham Outlaws	80
4	Andrew Winfield	Oxford Cavaliers	62
5	Donald Kudangirana	Sheffield Hallam Eagles	46

== Sources ==
- statistics
