= 2013 Conference League South =

- League: Conference League South
- Teams: 6

2013
- Champions: Sheffield Hallam Eagles
- League leaders: Sheffield Hallam Eagles
- Top point-scorer(s): Thomas Holt 240
- Top try-scorer(s): Thomas Ashton 21

The 2013 Conference League South was the first season under the new name. Founded in 2013 as a result of the restructuring of the game below the professional level. The Rugby League Conference which was broken up in 2011 was replaced for one season in 2012 by the National Conference League Division 3 which was placed under the banner of the National Conference League which had moved from winter to summer. Bristol Sonics, St Albans Centurions and Nottingham Outlaws moved across from National Conference League Division 3. The top two from Midlands Rugby League Premier Division, Northampton Demons as champions and Leicester Storm as runners-up moved up and a new club Sheffield Hallam Eagles, a joint venture set up by Sheffield Eagles and Sheffield Hallam University made up the 6 team competition. The teams would play each other three times during the regular season with the top four contesting the play-offs. The season ran from April to August

== Clubs ==
Club	Country	Ground	Coach
Bristol Sonics	(England)	Clifton RFC	Karl Fearnley
Leicester Storm	(England)	Brooksby Melton College	Dean Thomas
Northampton Demons	(England)	Dustin Sports Centre	Joe Smith
Nottingham Outlaws	(England)	Harvey Hadden Stadium	Paul Calland, Simon Morton
Sheffield Hallam Eagles	(England)	Don Valley Stadium	Andrew Henderson
St Albans Centurions	(England)	Toulmin Drive Sports Ground	Andy Champ

== League table ==
Pos	Team	Pld	W	D	L	F	A	Pts
1	Sheffield Hallam Eagles	15	14	0	1	832	180	28
2	Bristol Sonics	15	11	1	3	438	322	23
3	Nottingham Outlaws	15	8	1	6	396	414	17
4	Leicester Storm	15	7	0	8	342	344	14
5	Northampton Demons	15	2	1	12	184	548	5
6	St Albans Centurions	15	1	1	13	214	598	3

== Play-offs ==
Semi-final
1	Sheffield Hallam Eagles	52
4	Leicester Storm	10
2	Bristol Sonics	8
3	Nottingham Outlaws	21

Grand final
Sheffield Hallam Eagles	32
Nottingham Outlaws	24

== Results ==
Teams	Bris	Leic	North	Nott	Sheff	St A
Bristol Sonics	x	42-22	24-10 / 24-0	40-6 / 22-26	30-36 / 4-62	32-0
Leicester Storm	18-20 / 28-30	x	30-12	26-8	16-38	22-12 / 40-18
Northampton Demons	24-36	20-10 / 6-36	x	4-50	4-68 / 0-86	22-22
Nottingham Outlaws	22-22	22-4 / 24-38	28-30 / 50-28	x	16-54	28-8 / 50-14
Sheffield Hallam Eagles	40-42	44-18 / 38-12	24-0	48-0 / 62-20	x	88-18
St Albans Centurions	6-40 / 22-30	10-22	32-0 / 28-34	24-46	0-82 / 0-62	x

== Player statistics ==
=== Top try scorer ===
Pos	Player	Team	Tries
1	Thomas Ashton	Sheffield Hallam Eagles	21
2	Marcus Brooker	Bristol Sonics	19
3	Donald Kudangirana	Sheffield Hallam Eagles	16
4	Thomas Holt	Sheffield Hallam Eagles	15
5	Corey Hanson	Sheffield Hallam Eagles	14

=== Top goal kicker ===
Pos	Player	Team	Goals
1	Thomas Holt	Sheffield Hallam Eagles	90
2	Dom Swann	Bristol Sonics	36
3	Mark Etherington	Leicester Storm	21
4	Nick Tasker	Nottingham Outlaws	19
5			

=== Top point scorer ===
Pos	Player	Team	Points
1	Thomas Holt	Sheffield Hallam Eagles	240
2	Thomas Ashton	Sheffield Hallam Eagles	88
3	Marcus Brooker	Bristol Sonics	78
4	Donald Kudangirana	Sheffield Hallam Eagles	66
5	Sam Campbell	Nottingham Outlaws	60

== Sources ==
- statistics
