= List of rugby league clubs in Britain =

This article shows a list of professional rugby league clubs in Britain. It includes every team playing in levels 1–4 of the British rugby league system. Competitions listed are correct as of the 2021 season.

== League System ==
- Super League (level 1)
- Championship (level 2)
- League 1 (level 3)
- National Conference League and Conference League South (level 4)
- Various Regional Leagues (level 5)

== Alphabetically ==
=== A ===
Club	Division	Lvl
Askam	National Conference League	3

=== B ===
Club	Division	Lvl
Barrow Island	National Conference League	3
Barrow Raiders	Championship	2
Batley Bulldogs	Championship	2
Bedford Tigers	National Conference League	3
Beverley	National Conference League	3
Birkenshaw Blue Dogs	Yorkshire Mens League	4
Birstall Victoria	Yorkshire Mens League	4
Blackbrook	National Conference League	3
Bradford Bulls	Super League	1
Bradford Dudley Hill	Yorkshire Mens League	4
Bramley Buffaloes	Yorkshire Mens League	4
Brentwood Eels	National Conference League	3
Bristol All Golds	National Conference League	3
Brixton Bulls	National Conference League	3

=== C ===
Club	Division	Lvl
Castleford Tigers	Super League	1
Castleford Panthers	Yorkshire Mens League	4
Catalans Dragons	Super League	1
Canvey Knights	London and the South Rugby League	4
Chesterfield Forges	Midlands Rugby League	4
Clayton	Pennine League	4
Clock Face Miners	National Conference League	3
Crosfields	National Conference League	3
Chorley Panthers	North West Men's League	4
Cutsyke Raiders	Yorkshire Mens League	4

=== D ===
Club	Division	Lvl
Devon Sharks	National Conference League	3
Dewsbury Celtic	National Conference League	3
Dewsbury Rams	Championship	2
Dewsbury Moor	National Conference League	3
Dodworth Miners	Yorkshire Mens League	4
Doncaster	Championship	2
Doncaster Toll Bar	Yorkshire Mens League	4
Drighlington	National Conference League	3

=== E ===
Club	Division	Lvl
Eastern Rhinos	National Conference League	3
Eastmoor Dragons	National Conference League	3
East Leeds	National Conference League	3
Egremont Rangers	National Conference League	3
Elmbridge Eagles	London & South Rugby League	4

=== F ===
Club	Division	Lvl
Farnley Falcons	Yorkshire Mens League	4
Featherstone Lions	National Conference League	3
Featherstone Rovers	Championship	2
Fryston Warriors	National Conference League	3

=== G ===
Club	Division	Lvl
Garforth Tigers	Yorkshire Mens League	4
Gateshead Storm	North East ARL	4
Goole Vikings	Championship	2

=== H ===
Club	Division	Lvl
Halifax	Championship	2
Hammersmith Hills Hoists	National Conference League	3
Harrogate Hawks	Yorkshire Mens League	4
Hemel Stags	National Conference League	3
Huddersfield Giants	Super League	1
Huddersfield Sharka	Pennine League	4
Hull Dockers	National Conference League	3
Hull Kingston Rovers	Super League	1
Hull Knights	City of Hull and District	4
Hull F.C.	Super League	1
Hull Wyke	Yorkshire Mens League	4
Hunslet	Championship	2
Hunslet ARLFC	National Conference League	3

=== I ===
Club	Division	Lvl
Ince Rose Bridge	National Conference League	3

=== K ===
Club	Division	Lvl
Keighley Cougars	Championship	2
Kells	National Conference League	3
Kippax Welfare	National Conference League	3

=== L ===
Club	Division	Lvl
Leeds Rhinos	Super League	1
Leigh Leopards	Super League	1
Leigh East	National Conference League	3
Leigh Miners Rangers	National Conference League	3
Lock Lane ARLFC	National Conference League	3
London Broncos	Championship	2
London Chargers	National Conference League	3

=== M ===
Club	Division	Lvl
Maryport	National Conference League	3
Methley Warriors	Yorkshire Mens League	4
Midlands Hurricanes	Championship	2
Millom	National Conference League	3
Milford	National Conference League	3
Mirfield	Yorkshire Mens League	4
Myton Warriors	National Conference League	3

=== N ===
Club	Division	Lvl
Newcastle Thunder	Championship	2
New Earswick All Blacks	Yorkshire Mens League	4
Normanton Knights	National Conference League	3
North Herts Crusaders	National Conference League	3
North Wales Crusaders	Championship	2

=== O ===
Club	Division	Lvl
Odsal Sedbergh	Yorkshire Mens League	4
Oldham	Championship	2
Oldham St Annes	National Conference League	3
Oulton Raiders	National Conference League	3

=== P ===
Club	Division	Lvl
Pilkington Recs	National Conference League	3

=== Q ===
Club	Division	Lvl
Queensbury	Yorkshire Mens League	4

=== R ===
Club	Division	Lvl
Rochdale Hornets	Championship	2
Rochdale Mayfield	National Conference League	3

=== S ===
Club	Division	Lvl
Saddleworth Rangers	National Conference League	3
Salford City Roosters	North West Men’s League	4
Salford Red Devils	Championship	2
Sheffield Eagles	Championship	2
Sherburn Bears	Yorkshire Mens League	4
Shaw Cross Sharks	National Conference League	3
Seacroft Sharks	Yorkshire Mens League	4
Siddal	National Conference League	3
Skirlaugh	National Conference League	3
South London Silverbacks	National Conference League	3
St. Helens	Super League	1
Staffordshire Quantums	Midlands Rugby League	4
Stanley Rangers	National Conference League	3
Stanningley	National Conference League	3
Swinton Lions	Championship	2

=== T ===
Club	Division	Lvl
Thatto Heath Crusaders	National Conference League	3
Thornhill Trojans	National Conference League	3
Toulouse Olympique	Super League	1
Torfaen Tigers	National Conference League	3

=== U ===
Club	Division	Lvl
Underbank Rangers	Yorkshire Mens League	4

=== W ===
Club	Division	Lvl
Wakefield Trinity	Super League	1
Warrington Wolves	Super League	1
Waterhead Warriors	National Conference League	3
West Bowling	National Conference League	3
Wath Brow Hornets	National Conference League	3
West Hull	National Conference League	3
Wests Warriors	National Conference League	3
Wibsey Warriors	Yorkshire Mens League	4
Whitehaven	Championship	2
Widnes Vikings	Championship	2
Wigan St Judes	National Conference League	3
Wigan St Patricks	National Conference League	3
Wigan Warriors	Super League	1
Woodhouse Warriors	Pennine League	4
Woolston Rovers	National Conference League	3
Workington Town	Championship	2
Wyke	Yorkshire Mens League	4

=== Y ===
Club	Division	Lvl
York Acorn	National Conference League	3
York Barbarians	Yorkshire Mens League	4
York Knights	Super League	1

== See also ==
- List of rugby league clubs in Australia
- List of rugby league clubs in France
- List of rugby league clubs in New Zealand
