= 2015 Challenge Cup =

Rugby league competition

2015 Ladbrokes Challenge Cup
- Duration: 9 Rounds
- Number of teams: 78
- Highest attendance: 80,140; Leeds v Hull Kingston Rovers (Final)
- Lowest attendance: 87; Gloucestershire v Skirlaugh (3rd round)
- Broadcast partners: BBC Sport; Sky Sports
- Winners: Leeds Rhinos
- Runners-up: Hull Kingston Rovers
- Lance Todd Trophy: Tom Briscoe

The 2015 Challenge Cup, (also known as the Ladbrokes Challenge Cup for sponsorship reasons) was the 114th staging of the rugby league tournament for teams in the Super League, the British National Leagues and a number of invited amateur clubs.

The defending champions Leeds Rhinos retained the trophy beating Hull Kingston Rovers 50–0 at Wembley Stadium on 29 August 2015.

== First round ==
The draw for the first round of the 2015 Challenge Cup was held on 8 January 2015 at Wembley Stadium and featured 40 amateur teams from around the United Kingdom including two student teams, all three armed services and the police. Home teams were drawn by Martin Offiah and the away teams drawn by Brian Noble.

Fixtures for the first round were mostly played over the weekend of the 31 January – 1 February 2015. Three fixtures were postponed until the following weekend due to bad weather forcing the postponement on the original date.

| Home | Score | Away | Match Information |
| Home | Score | Away | Date and Time | Venue | Referee | Attendance |
|---|---|---|---|---|---|---|
| British Army | 8 – 20 | Wath Brow Hornets | Saturday 31 January 2015, 13:30 | Aldershot Military Stadium | L Staveley |
| Royal Air Force | 0 – 48 | Siddal | Saturday 31 January 2015, 13:30 | RAF Cranwell | J Smith |
| Walney Central | 28 – 8 | Hunslet Parkside | Saturday 31 January 2015, 13:30 | Central Drive | R Webb |
| Loughborough University | 16 – 42 | Hunslet Warriors | Saturday 31 January 2015, 14:00 | Loughborough University | C Hancock |
| Oulton Raiders | 60 – 6 | Scarborough Pirates | Saturday 31 January 2015, 14:00 | Oulton Community Sports Club | C Straw |
| Normanton Knights | 34 – 16 | Myton Warriors | Saturday 31 January 2015, 14:00 | Queen Elizabeth Drive | L Moore |
| Royal Navy | 32 – 14 | Saddleworth Rangers | Saturday 31 January 2015, 14:00 | United Services Recreation Ground | J Stearne |
| East Leeds | 12 – 20 | Kells | Saturday 31 January 2015, 14:00 | Easy Road | B Pearson |
| Egremont Rangers | 28 – 0 | Wigan St Judes | Saturday 31 January 2015, 14:00 | Gillfoot Park | J Callaghan |
| Widnes West Bank | 14 – 10 | South West London Chargers | Saturday 31 January 2015, 14:00 | Ted Gleave Sports Ground | A Mulligan |
| Hull Dockers | 10 – 6 | Leigh Miners Rangers | Saturday 31 January 2015, 14:00 | The Willows Club | M Mannifield |
| Elland RLFC | 26 – 0 | Leeds Beckett University | Saturday 31 January 2015, 14:00 | Greetland Community Centre | T Hudson |
| Lock Lane | 64 – 0 | Sharlston Rovers | Saturday 31 January 2015, 14:00 | Hickson's Arena | A Bentham |
| Skirlaugh Bulls | 27 – 20 | Aberdeen Warriors | Saturday 31 January 2015, 14:00 | Eastside Community S&S Club | S Race |
| West Hull | 14 – 12 | Thatto Heath Crusaders | Saturday 31 January 2015, 14:00 | West Hull Community Park | G Dolan |
| Valley Cougars | 27 – 22 | Leicester Storm | Sunday 1 February 2015, 14:00 | Treharris RFC | J Jones |
| Great Britain Police | 0 – 38 | Rochdale Mayfield | Sunday 1 February 2015, 14:30 | Arthur Miller Stadium, Stanningley | T Grant |
| Nottingham Outlaws | 4 – 50 | Blackbrook A.R.L.F.C. | Saturday 7 February 2015, 13:30 | Nottingham University Sports Field | C Etchells |
| Featherstone Lions | 46 – 10 | Queens RLFC | Saturday 7 February 2015, 13:30 | The Mill Pond Stadium | S Ansell |
| Shaw Cross Sharks | 18 – 16 | York Acorn | Saturday 7 February 2015, 14:00 | Shaw Cross Club | S Race |

== Second round ==
The draw for the second round was made on Monday 2 February at the Oulton Raiders club. The draw was made by two players who played in the 2014 final. Home teams were drawn by players Ryan Hall of Leeds Rhinos and away teams by Oliver Holmes of Castleford Tigers.

Following the conclusion of the first round ties; two clubs, Rochdale Mayfield and Hull Dockers, were reported to the Rugby Football League's Operational Rules Tribunal for each fielding an ineligible player. The Tribunal found both clubs guilty of the offence and disqualified them from the competition. The teams they defeated in the first round, Great Britain Police and Leigh Miners Rangers, were reinstated into the cup and played in the second round.

| Home | Score | Away | Match Information |
| Home | Score | Away | Date and Time | Venue | Referee | Attendance |
|---|---|---|---|---|---|---|
| Skirlaugh | 30 – 16 | Royal Navy | 14 February 2015, 13:00 | Eastside Community S&S Club | J Jones |
| Siddal | 12 – 31 | Featherstone Lions | 14 February 2015, 13:30 | Brighouse Rangers RFC | L Moore |
| Hunslet Warriors | 8 – 24 | West Hull | 14 February 2015, 14:00 | The Oval | B Pearson |
| Wath Brow Hornets | 27 – 12 | Lock Lane | 14 February 2015, 14:00 | Trumpet Road | S Race |
| Leigh Miners Rangers | 26 – 18 | Walney Central | 14 February 2015, 14:00 | Leigh Miners Welfare S&S Club | A Mulligan |
| Kells | 52 – 6 | Blackbrook A.R.L.F.C. | 14 February 2015, 14:00 | Old Arrowthwaite | M Mannifield |
| Elland RLFC | 16 – 4 | Egremont Rangers | 14 February 2015, 14:00 | Greetland Community Centre | G Dolan |
| Oulton Raiders | 48 – 0 | Valley Cougars | 14 February 2015, 14:00 | Oulton Community Sports Club | J Smith |
| Widnes West Bank | 38 – 16 | Great Britain Police | 14 February 2015, 14:00 | Ted Gleave Sports Ground | J Callaghan |
| Normanton Knights | 12 – 4 | Shaw Cross Sharks | 14 February 2015, 14:00 | Queen Elizabeth Drive | L Staveley |

== Third round ==
The draw for the third round was made on 17 February 2015 at Heritage Quay, University of Huddersfield. Round three saw the 14 Kingstone Press League 1 professional teams joining the competition to create a pool of 24 teams for the draw. The draw was made by previous Lance Todd Trophy winners Alex Murphy and Mal Reilly. Ties were played over the weekend of 7/8 March 2015.

| Home | Score | Away | Match Information |
| Home | Score | Away | Date and Time | Venue | Referee | Attendance |
|---|---|---|---|---|---|---|
| Elland ARLFC | 14 – 26 | Featherstone Lions | 7 March 2015, 14:00 | Greetland Community Centre | S Mikalauskas | 350 |
| Wath Brow Hornets ARLFC | 4 – 26 | Newcastle Thunder | 7 March 2015, 14:00 | The Clubhouse | W Turley | 400 |
| Oulton Raiders | 8 – 34 | Normanton Knights | 7 March 2015, 14:00 | Oulton Community Sports Club | J McMullen | 1,200 |
| Leigh Miners Rangers | 32 – 28 | West Hull | 7 March 2015, 14:30 | Leigh Miners Welfare S&S Club | J Smith | 350 |
| London Skolars | 4 – 86 | Swinton Lions | 7 March 2015, 15:00 | New River Stadium | A Gill | 165 |
| Kells | 12 – 29 | Rochdale Hornets | 7 March 2015, 17:00 | Recreation Ground (Whitehaven) | T Grant | 587 |
| Barrow Raiders | 36 – 22 | Keighley Cougars | 8 March 2015, 14:00 | Craven Park | G Hewer | 929 |
| South Wales Scorpions | 4 – 20 | York City Knights | 8 March 2015, 14:00 | Parc Dyffryn Pennar, Mountain Ash | C Campbell | 247 |
| North Wales Crusaders | 60 – 12 | Widnes West Bank | 8 March 2015, 14:30 | Glyndŵr University Racecourse Stadium | D Merrick | 523 |
| Hemel Stags | 10 – 22 | Oxford Rugby League | 8 March 2015, 14:30 | Pennine Way | A Sweet | 125 |
| Oldham R.L.F.C. | 46 – 6 | Coventry Bears | 8 March 2015, 15:00 | Whitebank Stadium | T Crashley | 256 |
| Gloucestershire All Golds | 66 – 4 | Skirlaugh | 8 March 2015, 14:30 | Prince of Wales Stadium | J Roberts | 87 |

== Fourth round ==
The draw for the fourth round was made on 10 March 2015 at the Provident Stadium, home of the Bradford Bulls. The draw was made by Leeds Rhinos' Jamie Peacock and Hull FC's Leon Pryce. The 12 winners of the third round ties were joined by the 12 Kingstone Press Championship teams. Ties were played over the weekend of 21/22 March 2015.

| Home | Score | Away | Match Information |
| Home | Score | Away | Date and Time | Venue | Referee | Attendance |
|---|---|---|---|---|---|---|
| Featherstone Lions | 8 – 58 | York City Knights | 20 March 2015, 20:00 | Big Fellas Stadium | S Mikalauskas | 1,200 |
| Leigh Centurions | 64 – 12 | London Broncos | 20 March 2015, 20:00 | Leigh Sports Village | M Woodhead | 2,448 |
| Normanton Knights | 6 – 78 | Batley Bulldogs | 21 March 2015, 14:00 | Belle Vue | A Gill | 851 |
| Leigh Miners Rangers | 32 – 6 | Oxford Rugby League | 21 March 2015, 14:30 | Leigh Sports Village | C Campbell | 787 |
| Whitehaven | 12 – 36 | Featherstone Rovers | 21 March 2015, 17:30 | Recreation Ground | C Kendall | 525 |
| Barrow Raiders | 16 – 56 | Halifax | 22 March 2015, 14:00 | Craven Park | T Crashley | 956 |
| North Wales Crusaders | 40 – 12 | Doncaster | 22 March 2015, 14:30 | Glyndŵr University Racecourse Stadium | W Turley | 416 |
| Dewsbury Rams | 28 – 18 | Newcastle Thunder | 22 March 2015, 15:00 | Tetley's Stadium | D Merrick | 703 |
| Bradford Bulls | 74 – 6 | Workington Town | 22 March 2015, 15:00 | Provident Stadium | C Leatherbarrow | 2,412 |
| Swinton Lions | 30 – 12 | Rochdale Hornets | 22 March 2015, 15:00 | Park Lane, Sedgley Park | J Bloem | 300 |
| Sheffield Eagles | 44 – 20 | Oldham R.L.F.C. | 22 March 2015, 15:00 | Keepmoat Stadium | A Sweet | 484 |
| Gloucestershire All Golds | 10 – 28 | Hunslet Hawks | 22 March 2015, 15:00 | Prince of Wales Stadium | J Roberts | 137 |

== Fifth round ==
The draw for the fifth round was made on Tuesday 24 March 2015 in Hull. The four clubs who finished the 2014 Super League season in 9th to 12th places; Hull Kingston Rovers, Salford Red Devils, Hull F.C. and Wakefield Trinity Wildcats respectively; joined the 12 winners from the fourth round in the draw. The draw was made by ex-players Johnny Whiteley (home teams) and Phil Lowe (away teams). Ties were played over the weekend 17–19 April.

| Home | Score | Away | Match Information |
| Home | Score | Away | Date and Time | Venue | Referee | Attendance |
|---|---|---|---|---|---|---|
| Wakefield Trinity Wildcats | 44 – 16 | Halifax | 17 April 2015, 19:30 BST | Belle Vue | J Cobb | 2,062 |
| Leigh Centurions | 22 – 18 | Salford Red Devils | 18 April 2015, 14:35 BST | Leigh Sports Village | P Bentham | 6,358 |
| Leigh Miners Rangers | 14 – 44 | York City Knights | 19 April 2015, 14:00 BST | Leigh Sports Village | G Hewer | 1,191 |
| North Wales Crusaders | 12 – 38 | Featherstone Rovers | 19 April 2015, 14:30 BST | Glyndwr University Racecourse Stadium | D Merrick | 617 |
| Hunslet Hawks | 16 – 31 | Dewsbury Rams | 19 April 2015, 15:00 BST | South Leeds Stadium | C Leatherbarrow | 536 |
| Bradford Bulls | 30 – 50 | Hull Kingston Rovers | 19 April 2015, 15:00 BST | Provident Stadium | M Thomason | 4,538 |
| Sheffield Eagles | 12 – 34 | Hull F.C. | 19 April 2015, 15:00 BST | Bramall Lane | G Stokes | 1,620 |
| Batley Bulldogs | 46 – 14 | Swinton Lions | 19 April 2015, 15:00 BST | Fox's Biscuits Stadium | C Kendall | 443 |

== Sixth round ==
The draw for the sixth round took place live on Sportsday on the BBC News channel on 20 April. The eight winners from this weekend's fifth round ties joined with the top eight First Utility Super League teams from 2014 in the draw to produce eight ties that will be played over the weekend of May 16–17. Home teams were drawn by Shaun Edwards and the away teams by Nathan McAvoy.

| Home | Score | Away | Match Information |
| Home | Score | Away | Date and Time | Venue | Referee | Attendance |
|---|---|---|---|---|---|---|
| Dewsbury Rams | 10 – 52 | Warrington Wolves | 15 May 2015, 20:00 BST | Tetley's Stadium | M Thomason | 1,771 |
| St. Helens | 46 – 6 | York City Knights | 15 May 2015, 20:00 BST | Langtree Park | C Leatherbarrow | 3,241 |
| Wigan Warriors | 12 – 16 | Hull Kingston Rovers | 15 May 2015, 20:05 BST | Leigh Sports Village | R Silverwood | 4,677 |
| Leeds Rhinos | 48 – 16 | Huddersfield Giants | 16 May 2015, 14:30 BST | Headingley Carnegie Stadium | P Bentham (Note: P Bentham withdrew at half time due to injury, replaced by J Roberts) | 8,133 |
| Hull F.C. | 40 – 14 | Castleford Tigers | 16 May 2015, 15:00 BST | KC Stadium | J Child | 6,750 |
| Wakefield Trinity Wildcats | 30 – 36 | Leigh Centurions | 17 May 2015, 14:15 BST | Belle Vue | B Thaler | 3,859 |
| Widnes Vikings | 26 – 22 | Batley Bulldogs | 17 May 2015, 15:30 BST | Select Security Stadium | J Cobb | 3,866 |
| Catalans Dragons | 37 – 34 | Featherstone Rovers | 17 May 2015, 18:00 BST | Stade Gilbert Brutus | R Hicks | 1,300 |

== Quarter-finals ==
The draw for the quarter-finals was made live on BBC Two on 17 May after the Wakefield Trinity Wildcats v Leigh Centurions game. The four ties that will be played over 25–28 June. The draw was conducted by former players Neil Fox (Wakefield Trinity) and Tony Barrow (Leigh). Barrow drew the home teams and Fox, the away teams.

| Home | Score | Away | Match Information |
| Home | Score | Away | Date and Time | Venue | Referee | Attendance |
|---|---|---|---|---|---|---|
| Hull Kingston Rovers | 32 – 26 | Catalans Dragons | 25 June 2015, 20:00 BST | KC Lightstream Stadium | P Bentham | 6,073 |
| Hull F.C. | 6 – 24 | Leeds Rhinos | 26 June 2015, 20:00 BST | KC Stadium | J Child | 9,261 |
| Warrington Wolves | 34 – 24 | Leigh Centurions | 27 June 2015, 15:00 BST | Halliwell Jones Stadium | R Silverwood | 10,119 |
| St. Helens | 36 – 20 | Widnes Vikings | 28 June 2015, 16:00 BST | Langtree Park | R Hicks | 8,806 |

== Semi-finals ==
The draw for the semi-finals was made live on BBC Two on 28 June after the St. Helens v Widnes Vikings game. The two ties were played on 31 July and 1 August. The draw was conducted by former Great Britain and St Helens player Paul Sculthorpe and former footballer turned television presenter Chris Kamara.

| Home | Score | Away | Match Information |
| Home | Score | Away | Date and Time | Venue | Referee | Attendance |
|---|---|---|---|---|---|---|
| Leeds Rhinos | 24 – 14 | St. Helens | 31 July 2015, 20:00 BST | Halliwell Jones Stadium | B Thaler | 11,107 |
| Hull Kingston Rovers | 26 – 18 | Warrington Wolves | 1 August 2015, 12:45 BST | Headingley Carnegie Stadium | R Silverwood | 13,049 |

== Final ==
| Home | Score | Away | Match Information |
| Home | Score | Away | Date and Time | Venue | Referee | Attendance |
|---|---|---|---|---|---|---|
| Hull Kingston Rovers | 0 – 50 | Leeds Rhinos | 29 August 2015, 15:15 BST | Wembley Stadium | B Thaler | 80,140 |

The final was played at Wembley Stadium on 29 August 2015, between the 1980 winners Hull Kingston Rovers, in their first final since 1986, and the 12-time winners and holders, the Leeds Rhinos.

Leeds' victory set a new record for the largest winning margin. The Lance Todd Trophy winner was the Leeds' Tom Briscoe who scored five tries - the first player to achieve this feat at Wembley.

Teams:

Hull Kingston Rovers: Kieran Dixon, Josh Mantellato, Kris Welham, Liam Salter, Ken Sio, Maurice Blair, Albert Kelly, Adam Walker, Shaun Lunt, Tony Puletua, Kevin Larroyer, Graeme Horne, Tyrone McCarthy (captain). Substitutes: John Boudebza, James Donaldson, Dane Tilse, Mitch Allgood.

Leeds Rhinos: Zak Hardaker, Tom Briscoe, Kallum Watkins, Joel Moon, Ryan Hall, Kevin Sinfield (captain), Danny McGuire, Mitch Garbutt, Adam Cuthbertson, Jamie Peacock, Stevie Ward, Carl Ablett, Brett Delaney. Substitutes: Rob Burrow, Kylie Leuluai, Mitch Achurch, Brad Singleton.
Tries: Delaney (1), McGuire (1), Briscoe (5), Singleton (1), Burrow (1). Goals: Sinfield (7/9)

== UK broadcasting rights ==
The tournament was jointly televised by the BBC and Sky Sports on the fourth of their five-year contracts. This time, the BBC televised two sixth round match while Sky Sports televised a fifth round match and a sixth round match. Both channels televised two quarter-final matches with the BBC televising the semi-finals and the final.

| Round | Live match | Date | BBC channel |
|---|---|---|---|
| Sixth round | Leeds Rhinos 48 - 16 Huddersfield Giants; Wakefield Trinity Wildcats 30 - 36 Leigh Centurions | 16 May; 17 May | BBC One; BBC Two* |
| Quarter-finals | Warrington Wolves 34 - 24 Leigh Centurions; St. Helens 36 - 20 Widnes Vikings | 27 June; 28 June | BBC One; BBC Two |
| Semi-finals | Leeds Rhinos 24 - 14 St. Helens; Hull Kingston Rovers 26 - 18 Warrington Wolves | 31 July; 1 August | BBC Two; BBC One |
| Final | Hull Kingston Rovers 0 - 50 Leeds Rhinos | 29 August | BBC One |

- Except Northern Ireland.

Sky Sports televised live the fifth round match between Leigh Centurions and Salford Red Devils on 18 April, the sixth round between Wigan Warriors and Hull Kingston Rovers on 15 May and the quarter-final matches between Hull Kingston Rovers and Catalans Dragons on 25 June and Hull F.C. versus Leeds Rhinos on 26 June.
