= Chris Davies (rugby league) =

Wales international rugby league footballer

Personal information
- Full name: Christopher Davies
- Born: 24 December 1991 (age 33); Abercynon, Wales

Playing information
- Height: 6 ft 2 in (188 cm)
- Weight: 18 st 8 lb (118 kg)
- Position: Prop
Club
Years	Team	Pld	T	G	FG	P
2011	South Wales Scorpions	15	1	0	0	4
2016–17	South Wales Scorpions	12	1	0	0	4
2020	West Wales Raiders	1	0	0	0	0
2023	Brentwood Eels	1	0	0	0	0
	Total	29	2	0	0	8
Representative
Years	Team	Pld	T	G	FG	P
2010	Wales	1	0	0	0	0

Chris Davies (born 24 December 1991) is a Welsh professional rugby league footballer who has played in the 2010s. He played at representative level for Wales, and at club level for South Wales Scorpions, as a prop.

== Background ==
Chris Davies was born in Abercynon, Wales.

== Playing career ==
Davies played in the youth team for the Celtic Crusaders when they won the National Youth League in 2009 and also played for the Crusaders reserve team before joining the South Wales Scorpions for the 2011 season. Davies did not play in the 2012 season due to injury.

In 2015, Davies played rugby union for Merthyr RFC during which time the club reached the final of the Mid District Cup.

Davies re-joined South Wales Scorpions for the 2016 season.

In December 2019, Davies joined West Wales Raiders for the 2020 season. In February 2020, Davies played in their 2020 Challenge Cup loss to Underbank Rangers. Davies was dismissed during the match and banned for six matches.

=== International honours ===
Davies won a cap for Wales while at Crusaders in October 2010. Davies also represented Wales at under-18 level, scoring once in their 34–20 win against England Community Lions U18 in June 2009, and twice in their 26–all draw against the same opponents in November 2010.
