= 2024 Challenge Cup =

British rugby league knockout tournament

- Duration: 9 rounds
- Broadcast partners: BBC Sport; Our League; The Sportsman
- Winners: Wigan Warriors
- Runners-up: Warrington Wolves
- Lance Todd Trophy: Bevan French (Wigan)
- Top point-scorer(s): Max Jowitt (56)
- Top try-scorer(s): Manoa Wacokecoke (8)

The 2024 Challenge Cup, known for sponsorship reasons as the 2024 Betfred Challenge Cup, is the 123rd edition of the Challenge Cup, the main rugby league knockout cup tournament in British rugby league, run by the Rugby Football League (RFL). It began over the weekend of 13–14 January 2024, and ended with the final, at Wembley Stadium on Saturday 8 June.

The cup was won by Wigan Warriors who beat Warrington Wolves 18–8 before a 64,000 crowd at Wembley.

Wigan's Bevan French was awarded the Lance Todd Trophy.

Leigh Leopards were the defending champions, having won the 2023 Final, defeating Hull Kingston Rovers 17–16 in extra time. They were eliminated in the quarter finals, losing 16–24 to Hull KR.

== Background ==
The competition started on 13 January, and concluded with the final on 8 June.

The Championship and League One clubs joined the tournament in round 3. Rounds 4 and 5 reduced the lower league clubs to four before the Super League clubs enter in round 6.

Toulouse Olympique of the Championship are not full members of the RFL and although invited to take part have declined as in previous years.

=== Format and dates ===
Challenge Cup competition format
Round	Date	Clubs involved this round	Winners from previous round	New entries this round	Leagues entering at this round
Round 1	13–14 January	20	None	20	20 UK based community, and armed forces league teams
Round 2	27–28 January	20	10	10	10 teams from National Conference League Premier Division
Round 3	10–11 February	32	10	22	All teams (except Toulouse) from the Championship and League One
Round 4	22 – 25 February	16	16	None	
Round 5	7–10 March	8	8	None	
Round 6	22–24 March	16	4	12	All 12 teams from the Super League
Quarter-finals	12–14 April	8	8	None	
Semi-finals	18 –19 May	4	4	None	
Final	8 June	2	2	None	

== First round ==
The draw for the first round was made by Josh Charnley on 5 December 2023. Ties were played over the weekend of 13 and 14 January 2024.

Challenge Cup round 1 fixtures
Home	Score	Away	Match Information
Home	Score	Away	Date and Time	Venue	Referee	Attendance
Royal Air Force	22–28	Royal Navy	13 January, 12:30	RAF Cranwell	T. Jones	Not given (Note: Attendances not recorded for matches involving amateur clubs)
Lowca	22–28	Edinburgh Eagles	13 January, 13:30	West Croft Terrace, Whitehaven	L. Seal	Not given
South Wales Jets	4–40	Stanningley	13 January, 13:30	Wales Rugby Club, Cardiff	J. Jones	Not given
Doncaster Toll Bar	22–20	Ashton Bears	13 January, 13:30	Doncaster Toll Bar Sports Club	D. Geddes	Not given
Clock Face Miners	22–20	Heworth	13 January, 13:30	Clock Face Miners Recreation	W. Turley	Not given
Fryston Warriors	13–10	British Army	13 January, 14:00	Fryston Social Club	C. Hughes	Not given
Oulton Raiders	22–34	West Bowling	13 January, 14:00	Oulton Sports Pavilion		Not given
Wests Warriors	28–4	Newsome Panthers	13 January, 14:30	Twyford Avenue Sports Ground	M. Cowan	Not given
Hammersmith Hills Hoists	56–6	Medway Dragons	13 January, 15:00	Chiswick RFC	G. Winnard	Not given
Orrell St James	20–4	Haresfinch	14 January, 14:00	Orrell St James Social Club	D. Arnold	Not given

== Second round ==
Challenge Cup round 2 fixtures
Home	Score	Away	Match Information
Home	Score	Away	Date and Time	Venue	Referee	Attendance
Leigh Miners Rangers	18–19	Stanningley	27 January, 12:30	Twist Lane	S. Jenkinson	Not given
Clock Face Miners	4–38	Siddal	27 January, 13:30	Clock Face Miners Recreation	L. Flavell	Not given
Doncaster Toll Bar	18–40	West Hull	27 January, 13:30	Doncaster Toll Bar Sports Club	O. Salmon	Not given
Fryston Warriors	0–68	Hunslet ARLFC	27 January, 14:00	Fryston Social Club	M. Clayton	Not given
Hull Dockers	0–38	Wath Brow Hornets	27 January, 14:00	The Willows Sports Club	C. Hughes	Not given
Lock Lane	72–0	Edinburgh Eagles	27 January, 14:00	Lock Lane Sports Centre	M. Mckelvey	Not given
Wests Warriors	28–22	Rochdale Mayfield	27 January, 14:00	Twyford Avenue Sports Ground	M. Cowan	Not given
Hammersmith Hills Hoists	32–10	West Bowling	27 January, 17:00	Chiswick RFC	G. Winnard	Not given
Royal Navy	24–32	Thatto Heath Crusaders	28 January, 12:30	United Services Recreation Ground	H. Winnard	Not given
Orrell St James	12–22	York Acorn	28 January, 14:00	Orrell St James Social Club	W. Turley	Not given

== Third round ==
The draws for the third and fourth rounds were made live on the BBC Sport website on 29 January. The draw took place at Widnes Vikings' DCBL Stadium. Hosted by broadcaster Tanya Arnold, the draw was made by brothers Mike and Steve O'Neill, both of whom played for Widnes in the club's 1983–84 Challenge Cup final victory.

Challenge Cup round 3 fixtures
Home	Score	Away	Match Information
Home	Score	Away	Date and Time	Venue	Referee	Attendance
Barrow Raiders	10–22	Oldham	10 February, 12:30	Craven Park	M. Griffiths	1,401
Cornwall	10–18	York Acorn	10 February, 13:00	The Memorial Ground	K. Young
Lock Lane	6–46	Hunslet ARLFC	10 February, 14:00	Lock Lane Sports Centre	S. Jenkinson
Sheffield Eagles	88–12	Newcastle Thunder	10 February, 14:00	Sheffield Olympic Legacy Stadium	D. Arnold	617
Stanningley	4–30	Wath Brow Hornets	10 February, 14:00	Arthur Miller Stadium	C. Hughes
Siddal	6–70	Wakefield Trinity	10 February, 14:00	Chevinedge	L. Bland	900
Hammersmith Hills Hoists	22–12	Wests Warriors	10 February, 14:30	Chiswick R.F.C.	H. Winnard
Batley Bulldogs	48–18	Workington Town	11 February, 14:00	Mount Pleasant	K. Moore
Dewsbury Rams	8–14	York Knights	11 February, 14:00	Crown Flatt	M. Smaill	824
Thatto Heath Crusaders	0–72	Featherstone Rovers	11 February, 14:00	Crusader Park	S. Houghton
Bradford Bulls	48–2	North Wales Crusaders	11 February, 15:00	Odsal Stadium	B. Milligan
Halifax Panthers	32–4	Whitehaven	11 February, 15:00	The Shay	C. Worsley
Hunslet	14–22	Keighley Cougars	11 February, 15:00	South Leeds Stadium	A. Sweet	817
Rochdale Hornets	24–20	Midlands Hurricanes	11 February, 15:00	Spotland Stadium	M. Lynn	411
Swinton Lions	50–6	West Hull	11 February, 15:00	Heywood Road	T. Jones	441
Widnes Vikings	50–16	Doncaster	11 February, 15:00	DCBL Stadium	L. Rush	788

== Fourth round ==
Challenge Cup round 4 fixtures
Home	Score	Away	Match Information
Home	Score	Away	Date and Time	Venue	Referee	Attendance
York Acorn	32–28	Wath Brow Hornets	24 February, 14:00	Thanet Road	N. Bennett
Halifax Panthers	50–4	Hammersmith Hills Hoists	24 February, 17:00	The Shay	B. Milligan	724
Bradford Bulls	12–26	Widnes Vikings	25 February, 12:30	Odsal Stadium	B. Thaler
Batley Bulldogs	30–14	Rochdale Hornets	25 February, 14:00	Mount Pleasant	M. Smaill
Wakefield Trinity	78–6	Hunslet ARLFC	25 February, 14:00	Belle Vue	M. Lynn	2,775
Keighley Cougars	14–58	Featherstone Rovers	25 February, 15:00	Cougar Park	S. Mikalauskas	1,477
York Knights	16–32	Sheffield Eagles	25 February, 15:00	York Community Stadium	L. Rush
Swinton Lions	28–12	Oldham	25 February, 18:00	Heywood Road	C. Worsley	746

== Fifth round ==
The fifth round draw was conducted on BBC Radio Leeds on 25 February.

Challenge Cup round 5 fixtures
Home	Score	Away	Match Information
Home	Score	Away	Date and Time	Venue	Referee	Attendance
Swinton Lions	12–14	Sheffield Eagles	9 March, 12:30	Heywood Road	M. Griffiths	412
Widnes Vikings	14–18	Batley Bulldogs	9 March, 18:00	DCBL Stadium	L. Rush	1,067
Featherstone Rovers	14–10 (Note: after golden point extra time)	Wakefield Trinity	10 March, 15:00	Post Office Road	B. Thaler
Halifax Panthers	62–6	York Acorn	10 March, 15:00	The Shay	K. Moore	785

== Sixth round ==
The sixth round draw was made on 11 March on BBC Sportsday. The draw was conducted by Iestyn Harris. The ties were played over the weekend of 22–24 March.

Challenge Cup round 6 fixtures
Home	Score	Away	Match Information
Home	Score	Away	Date and Time	Venue	Referee	Attendance
Hull KR	40–0	Salford Red Devils	22 March, 20:00	Craven Park, Hull	L. Moore
Leeds Rhinos	6–20	St Helens	22 March, 20:00	Headingley Stadium	C. Kendall	7,108
Wigan Warriors	44–18	Sheffield Eagles	22 March, 20:00	DW Stadium	J. Vella	5,733
Huddersfield Giants	50–6	Hull FC	23 March, 14:00	John Smiths Stadium	A. Moore	1,673
Leigh Leopards	26–14	Featherstone Rovers	23 March, 14:00	Leigh Sports Village	J. Smith	4,287
Batley Bulldogs	14–28	Castleford Tigers	23 March, 15:00	Mount Pleasant	M. Griffiths
Warrington Wolves	42–0	London Broncos	23 March, 17:30	Halliwell Jones Stadium	T. Grant	3,416
Halifax Panthers	4–40	Catalans Dragons	24 March, 15:00	The Shay	L. Rush	1,811

== Quarter-finals ==
The draw for the quarter-finals was made on 25 March. The ties will be played 12–14 April.

Challenge Cup round 6 fixtures
Home	Score	Away	Match Information
Home	Score	Away	Date and Time	Venue	Referee	Attendance
Hull KR	26–14	Leigh Leopards	13 April, 17:00	Sewell Group Craven Park	C. Kendall
Catalans Dragons	6–34	Huddersfield Giants	13 April, 19:00	Stade Gilbert Brutus	A. Moore	5,892
Castleford Tigers	6–60	Wigan Warriors	14 April, 15:00	Mend-A-Hose Jungle	L. Moore	4,097
St Helens	8–31	Warrington Wolves	14 April, 16:30	Totally Wicked Stadium	J. Smith	11,280

== Semi-finals ==
The draw for the semi-finals was made on 14 April, during half time in the match between St Helens and Warrington. The ties were played on 18 and 19 May as part of a double header, alongside the women's semi finals.

Challenge Cup semi final fixtures
Home	Score	Away	Match Information
Home	Score	Away	Date and Time	Venue	Referee	Attendance
Hull KR	6–38	Wigan Warriors	18 May, 13:45	Eco-Power Stadium	C. Kendall	11,163
Huddersfield Giants	10–46	Warrington Wolves	19 May, 15:15	Totally Wicked Stadium	L. Moore	9,253

== Final ==
The tie was played on 8 June as part of a triple header, alongside the women's final, and the 1895 Cup final. Following the death of Rob Burrow on 2 June, the RFL announced that kick-off for the final would be put back from 3pm to 3:07pm to honour Rob and the number seven shirt he wore. Rob's death was also commemorated with a minute's silence before kick-off and with a minute's applause during the seventh minute of the game.

Team 1	Score	Team 2	Match Information
Team 1	Score	Team 2	Date and Time	Venue	Referee	Attendance
Wigan Warriors	18–8	Warrington Wolves	8 June, 15:07	Wembley Stadium	Chris Kendall	64,845

== Broadcast matches ==
Broadcast matches
Round	Match	Date	Broadcast method
1st	Royal Navy v Royal Air Force	13 January	Broadcast live on BBC Red Button
1st	Fryston Warriors v British Army	13 January	Streamed live on BFBS Sport
1st	Orrell St James v Haresfinch	14 January	Streamed live on The Sportsman
2nd	Leigh Miners Rangers v Stanningley	27 January	Broadcast live on BBC Red Button
2nd	Orrell St James v York Acorn	28 January	Streamed live on The Sportsman
3rd	Barrow Raiders v Oldham	10 February	Broadcast live on BBC Red Button
3rd	Dewsbury Rams v York Knights	11 February	Streamed live on The Sportsman
4th	Bradford Bulls v Widnes Vikings	24 February	Broadcast live on BBC Red Button
4th	Swinton Lions v Oldham	25 February	Streamed live on The Sportsman
5th	Swinton Lions v Sheffield Eagles	9 March	Broadcast live on BBC Red Button
5th	Featherstone Rovers v Wakefield Trinity	10 March	Streamed live on The Sportsman
6th	Leeds Rhinos v St Helens	22 March	Broadcast live on BBC Red Button.
6th	Leigh Leopards v Featherstone Rovers	23 March	Streamed live on The Sportsman
QF	Hull KR v Leigh Leopards	13 April	Broadcast live on BBC Two
QF	St Helens v Warrington Wolves	14 April	Broadcast live on BBC Two
SF	Hull KR v Wigan Warriors	18 May	Broadcast live on BBC One
SF	Huddersfield Giants v Warrington Wolves	19 May	Broadcast live on BBC Two
Final	Wigan Warriors v Warrington Wolves	8 June	Broadcast live on BBC One
