= NCRL National Conferences =

Rugby league in the UK

- Founded: 2026
- Country: England
- Divisions: Conference Cumbria; Conference North West; Conference Southern; Conference Yorkshire
- Level on pyramid: 5
- Promotion to: National League One
- Relegation to: Cumbria Premier Division; East Rugby League; London and South East Rugby League; Midlands Premier Division; North East Rugby League; North Wales Men's League; North West Premier Division; South Wales Premiership; Yorkshire Premier Division
- Domestic cup: Challenge Cup
- League cup: National Cup
- Current champions: Ince Rose Bridge (2026)
- Website: NCRL

The National Conferences are five conference leagues that sit of the third level of the National Community Rugby League.

== History ==
In November 2025, the RFL launched its National Community Rugby League initiative which proposed replacing the National Conference League (NCL) with two national leagues and a number of regional leagues. While most clubs were not in favour of the initiative, the clubs decided to agree to the proposal "for the good of the sport". The NCL clubs met on 19 January and agreed to dissolve the NCL.

Several clubs hit out at being placed in conferences as some wanted to remain playing in national leagues while Barrow based clubs were unhappy at being placed in the National Conference Cumbria, as they had been playing in the North West Men's League for years.

Clubs from the old NCL Divisions Two and Three were put into the conferences as well as six clubs from the Yorkshire Premier Division; Fryston Warriors, King Cross Park, Mirfield Spartans, Newsome Panthers, Stanley Rangers, Siddal Academy as well as three clubs from Yorkshire Division 1; Bradford Dudley Hill, Kippax Welfare and Moldgreen.

From the North West Premier Division, five clubs were promoted to the National Conference North-West; Ashton Bears, Blackbrook, Haresfinch, Orrell St James, and Shevington Sharks. While Dalton were placed into the National Conference Cumbria along with Hindpool Tigers and Ulverston joined from North West Division 1.

The Conference League South folded for clubs to join the National Conference Southern.

== System ==
Clubs play in one of the five Conferences; Cumbria, North West, Southern, Yorkshire A or Yorkshire B. At the end of the regular season, winners of each Conference enter the playoffs to decide on promotion to National League One.

== National Conference Cumbria ==
=== Clubs ===
National Conference Cumbria
Name	Year founded	Location
Barrow Island	1925	Barrow-in-Furness, Cumbria
Dalton	1963	Dalton-in-Furness
Distington	1986	Distington, Cumbria
Ellenborough Rangers	1900	Maryport, Cumbria
Hensingham	1900	Hensingham, Whitehaven, Cumbria
Hindpool Tigers	1971	Barrow-in-Furness
Maryport	1968	Maryport, Cumbria
Millom	1873	Millom, Cumbria
Seaton Rangers	1968	Seaton, Cumbria
Ulverston	c. 1870	Ulverston, Cumbria

=== Results ===
Year	Winners	Pts	Runners-up	Pts
2026	Dalton	34	Hensingham	28

== National Conference North-West ==
=== Clubs ===
National Conference North-West
Name	Year founded	Location
Ashton Bears	1987	Ashton-in-Makerfield, Greater Manchester
Blackbrook	1952	Blackbrook / Sutton, St Helens, Merseyside
Clock Face Miners	1921	Clock Face, St Helens, Merseyside
Crosfields	1901	Warrington, Cheshire
Haresfinch	1979	St Helens, Merseyside
Ince Rose Bridge	2001	Ince-in-Makerfield, Greater Manchester
Leigh East	1977	Leigh, Greater Manchester
Orrell St James	1984	Orrell, Wigan, Greater Manchester
Saddleworth Rangers	1930	Greenfield, Saddleworth, Oldham.
Woolston Rovers	1959	Woolston, Warrington, Cheshire

=== Results ===
Year	Winners	Pts	Runners-up	Pts
2026	Orrell St James	27	Ince Rose Bridge	23

== National Conference Southern ==
=== Clubs ===
National Conference Southern
Name	Year founded	Location
Bristol All Golds	2013	Bristol
Bedford Tigers	2004	Bedford
Brentwood Eels	2004	Brentwood, Essex
Eastern Rhinos	1992	Colchester
Hammersmith Hills Hoists	2008	Chiswick, London
London Chargers	2013	Chiswick, London
North Herts Crusaders	2012	Hitchin
Wests Warriors	2014	Acton, London

=== Results ===
Year	Winners	Pts	Runners-up	Pts
2026	Hammersmith Hills Hoists	26	Wests Warriors	22

== National Conference Yorkshire A ==
=== Clubs ===
National Conference Yorkshire A
Name	Year founded	Location
Beverley	1883	Beverley, East Riding of Yorkshire
Bradford Dudley Hill	1947	Bradford, West Yorkshire
Drighlington	1973	Drighlington, West Yorkshire
Keighley Albion	1948	Keighley, West Yorkshire
King Cross Park	1919	Halifax, West Yorkshire
Mirfield Spartans	2026	Mirfield, West Yorkshire
Moldgreen ARLFC	c. 1880	Huddersfield, West Yorkshire
Myton Warriors	1997	Myton, Kingston upon Hull, East Yorkshire
Stanley Rangers	1919	Stanley, Wakefield, West Yorkshire
Thornhill Trojans	1988	Thornhill, West Yorkshire

=== Results ===
Year	Winners	Pts	Runners-up	Pts
2026	Keighley Albion	29	Mirfield Spartans	

== National Conference Yorkshire B ==
=== Clubs ===
National Conference Yorkshire B
Name	Year founded	Location
Bentley	1962	Bentley, Doncaster, South Yorkshire
Featherstone Lions	1994	Featherstone, West Yorkshire
Fryston Warriors	1944	Castleford, West Yorkshire
Hull Dockers	1880	Hull, East Riding of Yorkshire
Kippax Welfare	1948	Kippax, West Yorkshire
Milford	2001	Kirkstall, Leeds, West Yorkshire
Newsome Panthers	1995	Newsome, Huddersfield, West Yorkshire
Normanton Knights	1879	Normanton, West Yorkshire
Siddal Academy	2017	Siddal, Halifax, West Yorkshire
Skirlaugh	1980	Skirlaugh, East Riding of Yorkshire

=== Results ===
Year	Winners	Pts	Runners-up	Pts
2026	Featherstone Lions	31	Skirlaugh	30

== Playoffs ==
=== Cross-Conference final ===
Year	Winners	Score	Runners-up	Venue
2026	Ince Rose Bridge	38-6	Blackbrook	Odsal Stadium, Bradford

=== Shield final ===
Year	Winners	Score	Runners-up	Venue
2026	Myton Warriors	18-12	Ashton Bears	Odsal Stadium, Bradford
