= Conference League =

Conference League may refer to

- UEFA Conference League, the third tier of European association football competition
- National Conference League, the top English amateur rugby league competition
- Conference League South, the previous name for the Southern Conference League an amateur rugby league competition in England
- Conference League (speedway), a speedway division in the UK from 1996 to 2008
- The Football Conference, the previous name for the National League, the fifth and sixth tiers of the English association football pyramid.

== See also ==
- Conference League Cup
- Athletic conference
