= Michael Coady (rugby) =

English rugby league footballer (born 1987)

Personal information
- Born: 15 April 1987 (age 39) Bristol, England
- Height: 1.88 m (6 ft 2 in)
- Weight: 98 kg (15 st 6 lb)

Playing information

Rugby league
- Position: Wing, Centre
Club
Years	Team	Pld	T	G	FG	P
2009	Doncaster	9	5	0	0	20
2010–11	Leeds Rhinos	2	3	0	0	12
2010	→ Featherstone Rovers (loan)	7	2	0	0	8
2011	→ Doncaster (loan)	13	3	0	0	12
	Total	31	13	0	0	52

Rugby union
Club
Years	Team	Pld	T	G	FG	P
	Otley RUFC
- Source: As of 9 March 2011

Michael "Mike" Coady (born 15 April 1987) is an English former professional rugby union and rugby league footballer who played in the 2000s and 2010s. He played representative level rugby union (RU) for England Students, and at club level for Loughborough Students RUFC and Otley R.U.F.C., and club level rugby league (RL) in the Rugby League Conference for the Bristol Sonics (2006 to 2008) and Leicester Phoenix, in the Championship 1 for Doncaster (two spells, including the second on loan), in the Super League for Leeds Rhinos, and in the Championship for Featherstone Rovers (loan), as a wing or centre.

== Background ==
Mike Coady was born in Bristol, Avon, England, he was a pupil at Bristol Grammar School, he was a student at Loughborough University, he grew up supporting Halifax rugby league club through his father who was originally from Halifax, he was training to become a teacher in Leicestershire before leaving to join the Leeds Rhinos, as of 2026, he works at Pudsey Grammar School as a mathematics teacher, during September 2018 he returned to cricket and played for Alwoodley Cricket Club 2nd XI in the Airedale-Wharfedale Senior Cricket League.

== Playing career ==
Mike Coady played for Loughborough Students RUFC in the British Universities and Colleges Sport Cup final at Twickenham Stadium, he made his début for Featherstone Rovers on Sunday 14 February 2010, and he played his last match for Featherstone Rovers during the 2010 season.
