= Paul Emanuelli =

Wales international rugby league footballer

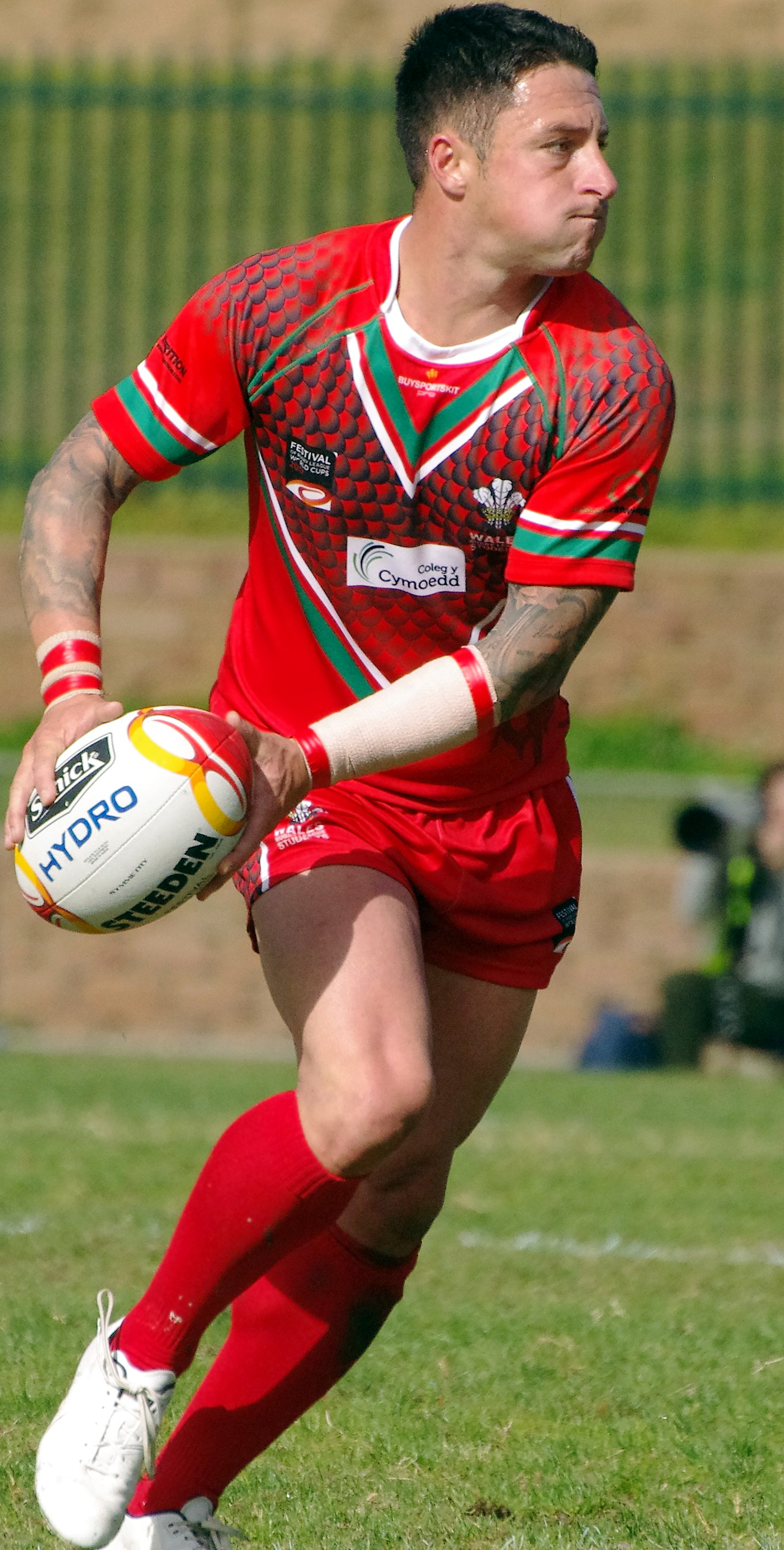

Personal information
- Born: 3 January 1984 (age 42) Newport, Wales
- Height: 5 ft 9 in (1.75 m)
- Weight: 13 st 10 lb (87 kg)

Playing information

Rugby union
Club
Years	Team	Pld	T	G	FG	P
	Blackwood RU

Rugby league
- Position: Scrum-half
Club
Years	Team	Pld	T	G	FG	P
	Blackwood Bulldogs RL
2008–09	Celtic Crusaders Colts
2010–11	Valley Cougars
2012	South Wales Hornets
2012–14	Valley Cougars
2014–17	South Wales Scorpions	43	2	77	2	164
2017–18	Coventry Bears	26	3	20	2	54
	Total	69	5	97	4	218
Representative
Years	Team	Pld	T	G	FG	P
2014	Wales	2	0	0	0	0

Paul Emanuelli (born 3 January 1984) is a Welsh rugby league footballer who last played for the Coventry Bears in League 1. He played as a scrum-half.

He was assistant coach at the Scorpions as well as being the Wales u18 head coach.

== Career ==
A product of Newport RU youth side he began his rugby career in union with Blackwood RU. After switching to rugby league he joined Blackwood Bulldogs, he has since played for Valley Cougars, Celtic Crusaders Colts where he won the Conference National Division title and South Wales Hornets. In 2012 he joined Valley Cougars as player-coach guiding the club to the 2014 Conference League South title. In 2014 he signed for Championship 1 club South Wales Scorpions and at the end of the season was picked for the Wales national side for matches against France and Ireland.

As an amateur he represented Wales Dragonhearts from 2007 to 2013

== Internationals ==
- 25 October 2014 - A v France, Stadium Municipal d'Albi, Albi 22-42 sub
- 2 November 2014 - H v Ireland, Racecourse Ground, Wrexham 14-46 sub
