= Hammersmith Hills Hoists =

English amateur rugby league club, based in London

Club information
- Full name: Hammersmith Hills Hoists Rugby League Football Club
- Colours: Navy, Green & Gold
- Founded: 2008; 18 years ago
- Website: Hillshoist.co.uk

Current details
- Ground: Chiswick RFC, Chiswick, London, England
- Chairman: Ricc Caligiuri
- Coach: Vince Spurr
- Manager: Dimitri Panaretos
- Captain: Luke Morrissey
- Competition: Southern Conference League

Records
- Premierships: 2009, 2010, 2011, 2012, 2017, 2018, 2019, 2023, 2024, 2025
- Runners-up: 2013, 2016

The Hammersmith Hills Hoists are an amateur rugby league club based in Hammersmith, London. Founded at the end of 2008 by local Australian expats to provide players of all nationalities, backgrounds and abilities the chance to play competitive rugby league in and around London, while also expanding their social networks in the process. The club usually play in the Southern Conference League – part of the fourth tier of Rugby League nationally.

The last parts of the name are an eponym – Hills Hoists are an Australian term for sturdy, rotary washing lines, particularly those with an advanced retraction mechanism – such is the nation's pride in these they are enrolled as of lasting heritage value in that country's national library and featured as roving robots in the 2000 Summer Olympics. One features in the club's badge.

== 2009 ==
In 2009, the Hoists' inaugural season, the club blazed a trail through the London League, winning 64–16 against Guildford, 64–4 versus Hemel, a 64–14 win over South London Storm and trouncing St Mary's 74–10 on their way to the Grand Final. Here they were met by a Hemel Stags side trying to overturn the huge deficit between the teams from earlier in the season, but the Hoists, in a riproaring season for Brendan Crilly and Mick Quinn, easily accounted for them: 58–6. Other notable performances came from Dujon Jorgenson who converted 9 out of his 10, as well as James Quarmby and Matt Fownes with try-scoring doubles. The club also tasted success in the Skolars Rugby League Invitational Nines tournament and the 2009 ANZAC Challenge. The team was victorious in the first-ever game of rugby league played in Belgium against Brabant Wallon Wavre Rugby XIII. The club also played Royal Navy, RAF and Metropolitan Police sides – the latter at the Twickenham Stoop as a curtain raiser for a Harlequins Super League game in front of 12,982 fans. The Hoists ran in 10 tries to 1 in a 60–4 demolition with Mick Quinn earning man of the match honours.

== 2010 ==
Due to their success in 2009, this team moved up to the Rugby League Conference South Premier division for the 2010 season, finishing 2nd on the competition ladder after recording a record of 10 wins, 2 losses and 2 draws, with St Albans Centurions capturing the minor premiership.

This saw the Hoists face the West London Sharks in the semi-final, for a chance to qualify for the season finale. Despite having home ground advantage the Hoists could not match the enthusiasm shown by their opposition in a see-sawing affair.

The Sharks opened the scoring in atrocious conditions, but the Hoists struck straight back through winger Tom Grigson who crossed in the corner. However, ill discipline and poor ball handling cost the home team, with repeat sets for the opposition stymieing the Hoists for the rest of the half, the Sharks running in several tries to go in to the break leading 24–4.

A different looking Hammersmith side came out in the second stanza, buoyed by an inspirational half time speech from coach Paul Farah and led by halfback Wayde Kelly, who began controlling the forwards in the middle of the park. ‘Smoking’ Joe Riesterer finished off a classy back line move to score minutes after the break with Chris Peach converting to make it 24–10

This was followed by two tries to strike centre Michael Lieberum, split by one score to the Sharks, getting Hammersmith back into the game at 28–20. Unfortunately ball security once again let the side down, letting in another Sharks try, before Lieberum found his way across the try line for a third time to make the score 34-24 heading towards full-time.

A final push from the Hoists proved fruitless, with another turnover gifting the West London Sharks another try and the 2010 premiership with a final score of 38–24.

The Hoists seconds team once again competed in the London League and went on to win it for the club for the second year running. The side defeating Northampton Demons 36–12 in the semi-final, before going on to win in the Grand Final 50–18 over the Bedford Tigers. Man of the match of the Grand Final victory was Daniel Loader.

2010 1st Grade Results
Date	Opposition	Venue	Result
24/04/2010	London Skolars	Home	48-18 W
01/05/2010	London Kiwis	Home	38-12 W
08/05/2010	Eastern Rhinos	Away	24-24 D
15/05/2010	West London Sharks	Home	16-16 D
22/05/2010	St Albans Centurions	Away	26-18 W
29/05/2010	Portsmouth Navy Seahawks	Home	38-18 W
05/06/2010	South London Storm	Home	36-32 W
19/06/2010	Hainault Bulldogs	Away	40-22 W
26/06/2010	London Skolars	Away	Forfeit W
03/07/2010	Eastern Rhinos	Home	50-28 W
10/07/2010	West London Sharks	Away	40-6 L
17/07/2010	St Albans Centurions	Home	56-16 L
24/07/2010	Portsmouth Navy Seahawks	Away	36-22 W
31/07/2010	South London Storm	Away	52-18 W
07/08/2010	Hainault Bulldogs	Home	Forfeit W
14/08/2010	West London Sharks (semi-final)	Home	38-24 L

2010 2nd Grade Results
Date	Opposition	Venue	Result
15/05/2010	West London Sharks	Home	48-14 W
29/05/2010	East London Phantoms	Home	24-16 W
07/08/2010	East London Phantoms	Away	62-6 W
14/08/2010	Northampton Demons (semi-final)	Home	36-12 W
21/08/2010	Bedford Tigers (Grand Final)	Neutral	50-18 W

=== Team Awards ===
Best and Fairest - Michael Lieberum

Player's Player - Matt Scott

Most Improved - Lewis Jones

Coach's Award - Wayde Kelly

Clubman of the Year - Ben Andrews.

=== Top Try Scorers ===
Michael Lieberum 19

Joe Reisterer 10

Wayde Kelly 7

Tom Grigson 7

Dujon Jorgenson 5

Wayne Baker 5

Jamie Fraser 5

== 2011 ==
2011 saw the Hoists go through the Rugby League Conference South Premier season undefeated, finishing with a 12–0 record while amassing 444 points on their way to the minor premiership.

This saw Hammersmith begin their finals campaign with a quarter final match up against Bridgend Blue Bulls in Swindon, easily dispatching of the Welsh side in a 10 try, 58-6 performance. Tries were scored by Wade Cairns (2), Murray Crapp (2), Richie West (2), Joe Riesterer (2), George Smibert and Albin Malguy. Best on ground were Cairns, Crapp and Taylor Sorenson.

The victory earned the Hoists a home semi final against the team that dashed their premiership hopes a season before, the West London Sharks. Hammersmith were never going to take this game lightly and after an initial arm wrestle, got out to a 16-0 half time lead through tries from a trio of the team's European contingent in Albin Malguy, Lewis Jones and Judd Greenhalgh.

The second half saw the Hoists consolidate the lead built in the first through more tries from James Sharpe, Joe Reisterer and Brenton Winnell to run out 32-0 winners, booking a place in the Grand Final. Best on ground was Luke Bolster who was immense in defence, stopping the Sharks attack dead on more than once occasion.

The Grand Final saw the Hoists match up against the team that finished third on the competition table, St Albans Centurions. In a tight affair played all the way down the wire, Hammersmith emerged victors by an 18-16 scoreline.

The London League team also repeated their achievement of the previous two seasons, by winning the London League competition over West Norfolk Wildcats 34–16, making it three premierships in a row.

The club's success saw many players selected for representative honours, with Michael Lieberum and George Smibert representing Scotland 'A', Daniel Marzella and Daniel Shembri represent Malta, and 5 players, Jason Wren-Patterson, Michael Lieberum, Wayde Kelly, Luke Morris and Michael Crosby selected to play in the inaugural Commonwealth Ex Pats team against the Great Britain Community Lions. Kelly captained the team and Lieberum picked up the man of the match award.

2011 1st Grade Results
Date	Opposition	Venue	Result
30/04/2011	London Skolars	Away	12-0 W
14/05/2011	St Albans Centurions	Away	44-14 W
21/05/2011	Eastern Rhinos	Away	52-6 W
26/05/2011	West London Sharks	Home	36-6 W
04/06/2011	South London Storm	Home	30-6 W
11/06/2011	London Skolars	Home	36-22 W
18/06/2011	West London Sharks	Away	24-12 W
25/06/2011	St Albans Centurions	Home	32-12 W
02/07/2011	Eastern Rhinos	Home	40-22 W
09/07/2011	South London Storm	Away	62-18 W
16/07/2011	West London Sharks	Away	32-16 W
23/07/2011	St Albans Centurions	Away	44-28 W
30/07/2011	Bridgend Blue Bulls (quarter-final)	Away	58-6 W
06/08/2011	West London Sharks (semi-final)	Home	32-0 W
13/08/2011	St Albans Centurions (Grand Final)	Neutral	18-16 W

== 2019 ==
2019 saw a fresh approach to the competition structure, with Hammersmith now competing in the newly founded Southern Conference League, launched by the RFL with the aim of bringing together the best community rugby league teams across the south of England and Wales.

Hammersmith finished the regular season in second position, only conceding 84 points in 8 regular season games while scoring a mammoth 328. A late season falter in the East Division Playoffs due to injury and player availability sent the Hoists off to Wales, where they fought a close encounter with the Torfaen Tigers, eventually running out 24-22 victors.

This meant for the third year running Hammersmith would face off against Wests Warriors in the semi-finals, renewing their rivalry for a qualification into the inaugural Southern Conference League Grand Final. A huge team defensive effort and a dominant two-try performance from dummy half Matthew Romano, saw the Hoists run out resounding victors 32–6, booking a place against London Chargers in the finale for a third straight year.

The Southern Conference League Grand Final was played at the Aldershot Military Stadium in Aldershot on 14 September 2019. It was a tight match. London Chargers led 4-0 deep into the second half. Tries from Nathan Mann, Jordan Darkwa and Blake Waterhouse saw Hammersmith win 16-10 and secure their third successive premiership. Man of the Match was awarded to fullback Dane O'Hehir who was a constant threat in attack and rock solid at the back.

=== Team Awards ===
Player's Player - Dane O'Hehir

Best Forward - David Kitenge

Best Back - Lynton Allen

Clubman of the Year - Darren Ackroyd

Life Membership for 5 years service - Jared Warren, Fred Cook

== Challenge Cup ==
Between 2018 and 2023 Hammersmith qualified for the RFL Challenge Cup on four occasions, but lost in the first round each time. They recorded their first win in the competition in 2024 and made it to the fourth round before being knocked out by Halifax Panthers.

Year	Round	Home	Score	Away
2018	Round 1	London Chargers	18–0	Hammersmith Hills Hoists
2019	Round 1	West Bowling	42–12	Hammersmith Hills Hoists
2020	Round 1	York Acorn	36–14	Hammersmith Hills Hoists
2023	Round 1	Hammersmith Hills Hoists	8–42	Dublin City Exiles
2024	Round 1	Hammersmith Hills Hoists	56–6	Medway Dragons
2024	Round 2	Hammersmith Hills Hoists	32–10	West Bowling
2024	Round 3	Hammersmith Hills Hoists	22–12	Wests Warriors
2024	Round 4	Halifax Panthers	50–4	Hammersmith Hills Hoists

== See also ==
- List of sports clubs inspired by others
