= West Wales Raiders =

Welsh professional rugby league club, based in Llanelli, Wales

Club information
- Full name: West Wales Raiders Rugby League
- Founded: 2014; 12 years ago
- Exited: 2022; 4 years ago
- Website: raidersrugbyleague.co.uk

Former details
- Ground: Stebonheath Park, Llanelli (3,700)
- CEO: Peter Tiffin
- Chairman: Andrew Thorne
- Coach: Ashley Bateman
- Captain: Morgan Evans
- Competition: League 1
- 2022 season: 11th

Uniforms
Home colours	Away colours

The West Wales Raiders were a semi-professional rugby league club based in Llanelli, Wales. They competed in League 1, the third tier of the British rugby league system, from 2018 until 2022.

The club was founded in 2014 as an amateur club, Gwendraeth Valley Raiders, who competed in the Welsh Conference Premier. In 2015, the team joined the Conference League South and dropped Gwendraeth Valley from their name.

In July 2017, owner Andrew Thorne bought League 1 club South Wales Ironmen, relocating them to Stebonheath Park in Llanelli. The Ironmen were renamed West Wales Raiders in 2018 and continued to play at Stebonheath Park. The club withdrew from the league at the end of the 2022 season.

== History ==
West Wales Raiders Rugby League Football Club

The club was founded in 2014 as an amateur club, Gwendraeth Valley Raiders, who competed in the Welsh Conference Premier in the 2014 season. In 2015, the team joined the Conference League South, and entering an 'A' team in the Welsh competition. The club also dropped Gwendraeth Valley from their name at this time. In December 2016, the RFL announced that the Conference League South would be discontinued for the 2017 season.

In July 2017, West Wales Raiders owner Andrew Thorne bought League 1 club South Wales Ironmen. The Ironmen moved to Llanelli's Stebonheath Park effective immediately. The club was rebranded the West Wales Raiders in 2018 and remained in League 1 and, as such, the Raiders can be regarded as a continuation of the Ironmen club, and their previous incarnation the South Wales Scorpions.

In April 2018, the club were on the receiving end of a record score and losing margin when they lost 0–144 to York. The previous highest scoring game was in November 1994 when Huddersfield beat Blackpool by 142–4; the losing margin was also equalled the next day in 1994 by Barrow who beat Nottingham City 138–0. An Australian news article after the York defeat suggested the team as "the world's worst rugby league team ever".

The West Wales Raiders finished the 2018 Betfred League 1 season winless and on negative points. The Rugby Football League imposed a four-point, retrospective deduction after the club pleaded guilty to breaching a number of Operational Rules regarding the fielding of ineligible players.

The 2019 season saw the West Wales Raiders again finish at the foot of the table but a win was registered in a home match against Coventry Bears. In 2019 they played 20 league matches and won 1, lost 19, scoring a total of 222 points and conceding 1091.

In 2020 former Wales rugby union international Gavin Henson briefly came out of retirement and signed for the Raiders.

In the 2021 League 1 season, West Wales finished bottom of the table failing to win a single game for the entire year. In the 2022 League 1 season, West Wales finished last on the table winning only one game for the entire year and losing their other 19 matches conceding 1196 points.

On 22 December 2022 the joint owners of the club, Andrew Thorne and Peter Tiffin, announced that the club had withdrawn from League One and the Challenge Cup for 2023.

== Seasons ==
Season	League										Challenge Cup	Other competitions		Refs
Season	Division	P	W	D	L	F	A	Pts	Pos	Play-offs	Challenge Cup	Other competitions		Refs
2015	Conference League South	16	10	0	6	634	402	20	3rd	Lost in semi-finals	—N/a			
2016	Conference League South	14	5	0	9	378	515	9	5th	Did not qualify	—N/a			
2017	—N/a													
2018	League 1	26	0	0	26	176	2106	−4	14th	Did not qualify	R3			
2019	League 1	20	1	0	19	222	1091	2	11th	Did not qualify	R3	1895 Cup	R1	
2020	League 1	League abandoned due to the COVID-19 pandemic									R3			
2021	League 1	18	0	1	17	238	942	1	10th	Did not qualify	R3 (Note: Officially round 1 due to the competitions temporary restructure in 2021.)	1895 Cup	R1 (Note: In 2021, the early rounds of the Challenge Cup doubled as 1895 Cup ties)	
2022	League 1	20	1	0	19	140	1196	2	11th	Did not qualify	R2			

== Records ==
Overall	P	W	D	L	F	A	Pts
Overall	84	2	1	81	776	5335	1
Overall	League 1 only						

- Biggest win:
  84–0 vs Gloucestershire Warriors (at Coney Hill, 15 August 2015)
- Biggest defeat:
  144–0 vs York City Knights (at Bootham Crescent, 29 April 2018)

== See also ==
- Rugby League in Wales
- Wales Rugby League
