= Dean Thomas (rugby league) =

English RL coach and former rugby league footballer

Personal information
- Born: 10 May 1966 (age 60) Stoke-on-Trent, Staffordshire, England
- Height: 6 ft 0 in (1.83 m)
- Weight: 15 st 8 lb (99 kg)

Playing information
- Position: Wing
Club
Years	Team	Pld	T	G	FG	P
1994–96	Ryedale-York	55	9	0	0	36
1997–99	Barrow Raiders	22	5	0	0	20
2000	York Wasps	5	1	0	0	4
	Total	82	15	0	0	60

Coaching information
Club
Years	Team	Gms	W	D	L	W%
2005–06	Gateshead Thunder	42	19	1	22	45
2018	Hemel Stags	22	2	0	20	9
	Total	64	21	1	42	33
Representative
Years	Team	Gms	W	D	L	W%
2009–11	Jamaica	6	2	0	4	33

Dean Thomas is an English rugby league football coach and former player. He was the coach of the Leicester Storm in the Conference League South.

== Player ==
Thomas played for Ryedale-York and Barrow Raiders. His primary position was winger. While at Ryedale-York he coached the York u16's in the English schools Rugby League after gaining his level 2 coaching badge.

== Coaching ==
After retiring from playing in 2001 Thomas joined Sheffield Eagles rugby league club as fitness conditioner staying in this role for 5 years. He left to join National League Two club Gateshead Thunder as head coach. During his two-season stay he took the club to the play-offs in both seasons. He left to go to Salford City Reds where he was a fitness conditioner. In 2008 he returned to Sheffield Eagles as Head of Youth Development and performance coach. Thomas was appointed head coach of Leicester Storm in 2013

== International ==
Thomas was appointed head trainer for the West Indies in 2004. Thomas and Corey Simms recorded an adapted version of Zahira Hillman's Anthem without a title which was played before West Indies' match against the South Africa Wild Dogs in October 2004.

In 2009 he was appointed head coach of Jamaica where he coached them in the 2009 Atlantic Cup, and the qualifiers for the 2013 Rugby League World Cup
