= Leicester Storm =

English amateur rugby league club, based in Leicester, Leicestershire

- The Phoenix

Club information
- Full name: Leicester Storm Rugby League Football Club
- Nickname(s): The Storm
- Colours: Navy Purple & White
- Founded: 1986; 39 years ago
- Exited: 2018; 7 years ago
- Website: leicesterstorm.co.uk

Former details
- Ground(s): New College, Glenfield Road, Leicester, LE3 6RN
- Chairman: (Australia) Ty Watson
- Coach: (Jamaica) Dean Thomas
- Captain: (England) Max Oxton-Morris
- Competition: 1st Grade: Co-Op Conference League South; Academy: 3v Sport Midlands Rugby League

Leicester Storm was an amateur community rugby league football club based in Leicester, England. They competed in the Conference League South and their Academy Team competed in the Midlands Rugby League. The club's home was Phoenix Park which is in the suburb of Saffron Lane, South-West Leicester, where they played since 2006. Leicester were one of the oldest clubs in the Rugby League Conference.

The club was founded in 1986 by Howard Ludbrooke and Phil Jackson under the name of Leicester Rugby League, after playing in the East Midlands Amateur Rugby League Association (initially known as the Nottingham & Mansfield Amateur Rugby League Association).Player coach Paul Walmsley joined the club in 1990 & Leicester became a dominant force in Midlands rugby League throughout the 90s. The LRLFC were one of the 10 founder members of the Rugby League Conference (then the Southern Conference League) in 1997, reaching the grand final in the inaugural season. In the 1998 season Leicester Rugby League was rebranded Leicester Phoenix. In 2007 Paul Walmsley stepped down as coach and retired from playing.

2010 saw the club rebrand itself as Leicester Storm. The Storm name and colours come from the unique association that Leicester shares with Melbourne Storm.

For the 2013 season, Storm appointed Jamaica national rugby league team coach Dean Thomas as their new head coach, and the club will be competing in the newly formed Conference League South, along with Nottingham, St Albans, Bristol, Northampton and Sheffield Hallam Eagles.

== History ==
The club was founded in 1986 and Leicester lifted their first silverware in the form of the Nottingham and Mansfield Amateur Rugby League Association (NAMARLA) Division Championship in the 1987/88 season.

During 1993/94, Leicester competed in the East Midlands Amateur League finishing a creditable 3rd. During the season Leicester played at their current home location of Aylestonians. Other successes during this season saw Leicester make it through to the second round of the National Cup only to lose to Carlisle 20–10 away. Leicester also made it through to the second round of the East Midlands Cup (Stephenson Cup) losing to Doncaster 30–18.

1994/95 saw talks of a National Development League in which Leicester, and in particular Chairman Julian Harrison, were at the forefront of discussions alongside the then London Broncos Development Bev Risman.

During the season, Super League would become Europe's top-level competition to play during the summer of 1996. With club mergers being planned throughout the country, Leicester saw this as an opportunity to bring top level rugby league to the East Midlands, so the plan was drawn up to merge Leicester Rugby League with Northampton Knights and Peterborough Rugby League. The strategy was for the new merged team, East Midlands Knights, to enter the National Conference League Division 2 and then progress up to Super League. A friendly fixture against Hull F.C. was also penned in for the team to get some top level experience. However, due to administrative and travel issues amongst players and staff the plans for the East Midlands Knights were shelved, and local level development was seen as the best way for the development of rugby league in Leicester. During the season, Leicester saw two of their star players, Curtis Thomas and Laurence Taylor, being signed by Super League club Sheffield Eagles.

The 1995–96 season would be the last that Leicester would play during the winter and the first season that Leicester would put together a junior team and make strides with junior development within the city. Still playing at Aylestonians, through club coach Paul Walmsley and chairman Julian Harrison, junior development climaxed with a junior camp held in Sheffield, which was run in partnership with Sheffield Eagles and Leicester City Council. This offered Leicester youngsters an opportunity to receive professional coaching and tuition.

=== 1997 – the beginning of summer Rugby League ===
Leicester, a club with a history of initiative thinking, became one of the ten founder members of the then Southern Conference League (since 1998 it has been known as the Rugby League Conference). The conference was split into two divisions: East and Central. Leicester also moved from Aylestonians to the Saffron Lane Athletics Stadium, which housed a 3,000-seater stand.

Under the stewardship of Walmsley, Leicester won the inaugural Central Division which saw them face the winners of the East Division, North London Skolars, in the Grand Final which was played at Staines RUFC. Leicester came out 32–16 losers.

1998 saw a Phoenix born. Clubs were asked by the RLC to brand themselves; Leicester Rugby League were duly rebranded Leicester Phoenix Rugby League. Phoenix started their campaign with a friendly match against the Russian Champions Strela which saw them narrowly lose at Saffron Lane. Phoenix were able to field an under-13s and an under-15s junior side.

During the 1999 season, the Phoenix played in front of their biggest crowd to date. On the Super League road show, the Bradford Bulls played London Broncos at Leicester Tigers' home ground of Welford Road. The Phoenix were asked to play their conference game against Coventry Bears as a pre-game to the Super League encounter. In front of 7,000 fans, the Phoenix toppled the Bears 25–18 in what was to start a ferocious rivalry between the clubs. This season saw the Phoenix move back to Aylestonians.

During the 1990s, Leicester played host to four rugby league nines tournaments. Local and national club sides were invited to enter the tournament from across the country by club coach & organiser Paul Walmsley. The First Tournament saw Wakefield lift the inaugural trophy in 1995, Leicester win the trophy in 1996 and 1997, and a side from Castleford win the last tournament in 1998.

2000 saw 24 clubs, split into 4 regions, contest the Rugby League Conference. Leicester's previous chairman Julian Harrison was appointed the new Conference Administrator. During the upcoming years, the Phoenix struggled to find a home location which would match their desire to progress forward and help to develop rugby league within Leicester. From 2000 to 2009, Phoenix have been based at no less than six locations throughout the city.

Success came to Leicester during the 2004 season when Phoenix won the RLC South Midlands division.

In the 2006 season, the Phoenix were invited to join the Midlands Premier which they finished in 3rd place. 2006 also saw Centre Karl Wesley represent the England Lionhearts against Serbia scoring in the 46–6 win in the Radnički Stadium, Belgrade.

Playing at Leicester Forest's Hinckley Road Ground, Phoenix faced a challenging season which saw the club finish 8th in the Midlands Premier.

During the 2008 season, the Phoenix competed in the Midland Premier division. After reaching an agreement with Aylestone St. James RUFC, all of their home games were played at their Covert Lane Ground in the Scraptoft area of the city. On the playing front, the Phoenix had a mixed playing season, the highlight being the defeat of the Bedford Tigers at home, whom, in the away fixture at the start of season gave the Phoenix their biggest defeat of the season. The Phoenix battled to 7th spot in the Midlands Premier Conference. Off the pitch, international honours went to Richard Knight who represented Scotland Students at the Students Rugby League World Cup in Australia and also Scotland A in the Home Nations Tournament.

During the 2009 pre-season, much work went on re-structuring the club with a new committee formed under the stewardship of the newly appointed Club chairman, Mark Sloan. Former Coventry Bears captain and coach Ty Watson joined the Phoenix as Director of Rugby League. During the 2009 season, Phoenix played in the Midlands Premier division under the leadership of former Sheffield Eagles and Great Britain Student player Greg Hurst.

Under new coach Watson, Leicester topped the Midlands Premier division after round 5. However, due to an injury crisis in the second half of the season the Phoenix slipped down the conference finishing 5th and just outside the play-offs.

The season also saw the birth of the academy team who played fixtures in the 3v Sport Midlands Merit League. In total, over 30 players played in Academy games with ages ranging from 16 to 40. The injury crisis within the First Grade allowed many Academy Players to be bled into the First Grade which can only be good for the long-term development of the Phoenix.

Off the field, developments and huge strides were made in development and financial security. The junior development within Leicester made huge strides through the creation of the Phoenix Festival of Rugby League hosted by New College, Leicester. This event attracted over 40 children of Primary School age and exposed Rugby League to children, teachers and parents who otherwise would not have access to it. The Phoenix were also back in the tabloids through regular news reports in the region's premier newspaper, the Leicester Mercury. The Storm formed a partnership with Sports Company 3v Sport which saw the leading sportwear company sponsor the club and provide support with marketing and fundraising.

At the end of the season, Chris Baron was signed by the Engage Super League side Warrington Wolves to become the Head of Strength and Conditioning, and also former Phoenix player Michael Coady, who had a brief stint with the club during 2008, was signed by Super League Champions Leeds Rhinos.

=== 2010 – from the ashes of the Phoenix, a Storm in a teacup.. ===
The Phoenix badge used by the club until becoming the Storm in 2010

After a successful period as club chairman in which he guided the club through some very challenging and exciting times, Mark Sloan stepped down from the position as club chairman. At the 2009 AGM, in his place Ty Watson was elected as the new club chairman from his position as Director of Rugby for the 2010 season.

2010 saw the club rebrand itself as Leicester Storm. The Storm name and colours came from the association that Leicester shares with Melbourne Storm. After meeting Melbourne Storm Operations Manager Frank Ponnissi in Leeds the club decided to rebrand the club to signal its rebirth and herald in a new era. The club also forged a link with the professional team Sheffield Eagles which saw the clubs share coaching resources and methods as well as providing a clear pathway for talented players and coaches. An academy team which was started in 2009 went on to play a full season (for new and young players) and went on to win the 3v Sport Midlands League. There was also a record number of players making representative teams, including one making a Great Britain appearance plus three players signing professional contracts with championship side Sheffield Eagles,

In 2011 the Storm employed in partnership with the RFL a full-time community sports coach and started a full junior programme including under-11s, under-13s, under-14s, under-16s and under-18s. 12 players this year have made representative teams with 2 currently considering contracts from Sheffield Eagles. The academy team had another great year making the 3v Sport Midlands Rugby League Finals, losing to the eventual winners. The 1st Grade side enjoyed their most successful season for many years making the Grand Final against Bristol Sonics. This game would be the last for Head Coach Ty Watson who has decided to hang up his boots after 20 years playing the game.

In 2018, it was confirmed that the club had folded.

== Notable players ==
- Ty Watson: Ty is a former Super League player with Australian team Western Reds who has played for the club since 2009 when he took over the coaching reins.
- Greg Hurst: Greg is a Sheffield Eagles Hall of Famer who graced Don Valley Stadium for over 100 games for the clubs with some very attractive and crowd-pleasing rugby league.
- Darren Birch: Birch is a try-scoring centre who plies his trade for the Phoenix. Birch is also a current Great Britain Police representative and has amassed over 30 caps for the GB Police.
- Michael Coady: A former Bristol Sonic, Loughborough University and Doncaster player, Michael signed for Leeds Rhinos on 16 June 2009.
- Ollie Smith: Ollie would later go on and play professionally for the Leicester Tigers, England and the British and Irish Lions.

== Club honours ==
- Leicester 9s Tournament: 1996 and 1997
- NAMARLA Division Champions: 1987/88
- DNGC Winners: 4 years running
- RLC Central Division: 1997
- RLC South Midlands Division: 2004
- Midlands Rugby League: 2010

== Representative honours whilst at the Storm ==
- England Lionhearts: Karl Wesley (2007), Demetrious Gonsalves (2010)
- England Community Lions Under 18s: George Leng (2011), Sam Hull (2011)
- Great Britain Police Force: Darren Birch (2009–present)
- Great Britain Students: Mike French, Greg Hurst, Tim Farnden
- Irish Students: Kieron Collins (2005–2007), Maximillion Oxtongue-Maurice (2005–2007)
- Poland: Michal Fornalczyk
- Scotland A: Richard Knight (2010), Francis Barlow (2013)
- Scotland Students: Dan Hay (2012), Richard Knight (2010), Simon Charvet
- South of England: Karl Wesley
- East of England: Craig Hewitt, Dan Rouse, Dave Wilkins, Gaz Jones, Mark Sloan, Mark White
- East Midlands: Mark Whalley
- Midlands: Paul Walmsley, Ash Hutchinson, Callum Corley, Dave Wilkins, Mark White, Mahmood Saad, Liam Collins
- Midlands Invitational: Paul Walmsley, Duncan Green, John Boden, Paul Walmsley
- Midlands AASE Academy 2014: Lewis Chapman, Cameron Birnie, Oli Wakeling, Akshaye Vig
- Midlands AASE Academy 2013: Dylan Bale, Jason Bass, Callum Smith, Ben Gray, Matt Davies
