= Torfaen Tigers =

Welsh rugby league club, based in Pontypool, South Wales

Club information
- Full name: Torfaen Tigers RLFC
- Colours: Black / orange / white shirts and Black shorts
- Founded: 2003; 22 years ago
- Website: www.torfaentigers.co.uk

Current details
- Ground(s): New Panteg RFC, Pontypool
- Chairman: Rob Davies
- Coach: Ian Newbury
- Captain: Matt Williams
- Competition: Conference League South
- 2018: 2nd

Torfaen Tigers are a rugby league team based in Pontypool, Torfaen, Wales. They play in the Southern Conference League division, which is the 4th tier in the Rugby league pyramid

Torfaen Tigers runs 4 junior teams U12's,14's,16's and 19's in the Welsh leagues as well as 2 senior teams playing in the Southern Conference & Welsh Premier League respectively.

== History ==
Torfaen Tigers were founded in April 2003, they joined the Welsh division of the Rugby League Conference. In their inaugural year, the Tigers finished third in the Welsh division and reached the final of the RLC Plate competition where they lost to East Lancashire Lions. They also reached the National Conference Plate Final, losing to East Hull and, in the process, becoming one of the last teams to play on Warrington's Wilderspool Stadium ground before the Super League club moved out.

2004 saw the Tigers consolidate their position within the Welsh division and reach the semi-final of the Harry Jepson Trophy.

The Tigers got off to a slow start in 2005, but as new young players grew in confidence the team's results improved. The second half of the season saw the Tigers become the first Welsh side to beat Bridgend Blue Bulls since the league had been formed, and continuing success saw them go on to beat Aberavon Fighting Irish to earn them a place in the Welsh Grand Final for the first time. Against the holders Bridgend, The Tigers got off to a good start and lead for much of the first half, but Bridgend dug deep and battled back to retain their title.

In 2012, the club decided that the infrastructure at the club was unsustainable and decided not to enter the South Wales Premier to rebuild and ensure long term sustainability. The club got a new board and they moved ground from Pontypool United RFC to Cwmbran RFC's Kings Head ground.

Tigers returned to the South Wales Premier for the 2013 season winning the Grand Final v Valley Cougars 24-18. The following year they reached the Grand Final again but lost v Bridgend Blue Bulls 20-36. In 2015 the club were invited into the Conference League South finishing 6th in their debut season

In 2021 the Torfaen Tigers launched their Wheelchair Rugby League team as part of the Championship West League.

== Club honours ==
- South Wales Premier: 2013

== See also ==
- Rugby League in Wales
- Wales Rugby League
- List of rugby league clubs in Britain
