= Wests Warriors =

English semi-professional rugby league club

Club information
- Full name: Wests Warriors Rugby League Football Club
- Nickname(s): Wests; Warriors
- Short name: Wests Warriors
- Colours: Black and Green
- Founded: 2014; 12 years ago
- Website: westswarriors.com

Current details
- Ground: Twyford Avenue Sports Ground, Acton, London
- Coach: Kim Parkinson
- Captain: Neil Thorman
- Competition: Southern Conference League
- 2025 season: 1st

Uniforms
Home colours

Records
- Southern Conference League: 2 (2021, 2022)
- Challenge Cups: 0
- Other honours: 6

The Wests Warriors are an amateur rugby league club based in Acton, London, England who compete in the Southern Conference League. They are coached by Kim Parkinson and play their home games at the Twyford Avenue Sports Ground, which is where the rugby union sides Wasps FC and Wasps Women play.

The Wests Warriors' home colours are black and green.

== History ==
The club was formed in 2014 as Wests Warriors Rugby League Football Club and entered into the London And South East Merit League. They won that league and the London Challenge Cup in their inaugural season. They went to become London Champions again in 2016 and 2019.

They have won the Southern Conference League Grand Final, with victories in 2021 and 2022. They have also won the League Leaders Shield on three occasions, in 2021, 2023 and 2025.

One of their biggest ever matches was playing the Leeds Rhinos away at Headingley in the third round of the 2025 Challenge Cup. The match was switched from London to Leeds, allowing the community club to play at Leeds' historic stadium, with the game ending 92-0 to the Super League side.

The following season, Wests were drawn away to London Broncos in the second round of the 2026 Challenge Cup, the first ever competitive London derby for the Broncos. Played at Richmond, the Broncos won 86-0 in a club record scoreline.

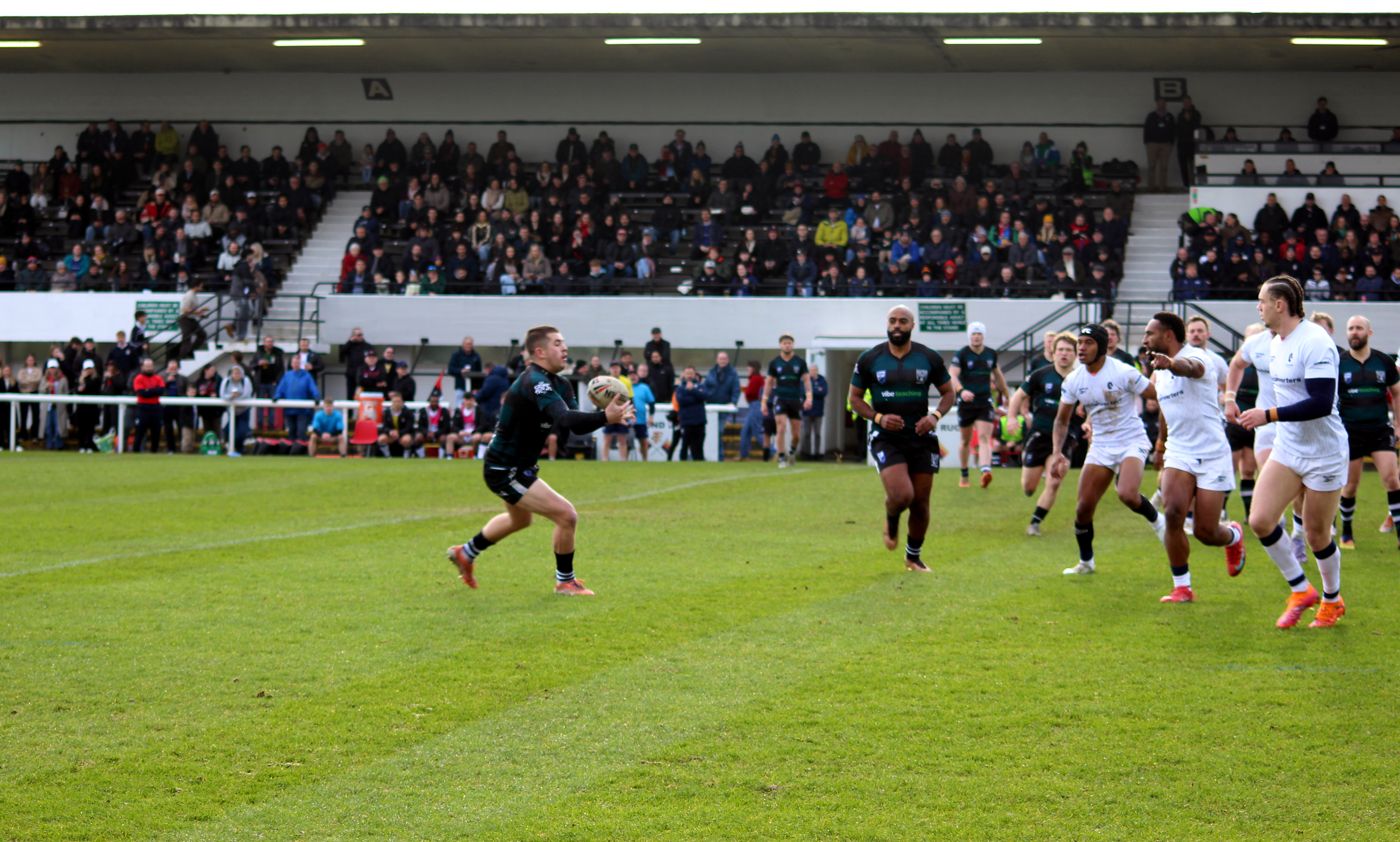
The Wests Warriors with ball against the London Broncos in the Challenge Cup at the Athletic Ground, Richmond in 2026

== Notable players ==
- (Australia) Jarred Bassett
- (England) Illies Macani
- (Greece) Adam Vrahnos

== See also ==
- Rugby Football League expansion
- Sport in London
