= Brentwood Eels =

English amateur rugby league club

Club information
- Full name: Brentwood Eels RLFC
- Founded: 2004; 22 years ago
- Website: brentwoodrlfc.co.uk

Current details
- Ground: Old Brentwoods Club, Brentwood, Essex, England
- Competition: NCRL Conference Southern

The Brentwood Eels are a rugby league club from Brentwood in Essex, England. The club, which was founded in 2004 as the Brentwood Elvers, plays their home games at The Old Brentwoods Club, Ashwells Road, Brentwood in Essex.

== History ==
Brentwood Eels RLFC was originally established as the Brentwood Elvers in October 2004, initially as a junior team, before taking the decision in 2013 to introduce a men's open age team.

The club rebranded in 2014 to Brentwood RLFC "The Eels".

In 2019, the club were champions of the East Rugby League and played in the semi-finals of the Harry Jepson Trophy. They won the East Rugby League again in 2021, and joined the East Division of the Southern Conference League the following season. In 2022 the club also expanded to include a girl's, women's and wheelchair team.

In 2023 they made their debut in the Challenge Cup with a home tie against Bedford Tigers. They went on to win this 34–24 before getting beaten by Wath Brow Hornets in the second round 58–4.

In 2026, following a restructuring of the league system, they joined the Southern Conference of the National Community Rugby League.

== Women's team ==
The women's team took part in the Southern East League 1 competition in 2024 before joining the 2025 Southern Championship.

== Wheelchair team ==
The wheelchair rugby league team was established in 2022 and play at the Brentwood Centre. In 2024, they took part in the Championship South and in the Regional South competition the following season.

== Notable players ==
- Alex Walker: (Scotland)
- Joe Keyes: (Ireland)
- Mason Billington: (England wheelchair)
