= Donald Kudangirana =

Zimbabwean rugby league footballer

Personal information
- Born: 23 May 1995 (age 30)

Playing information
- Position: Wing
Club
| Years | Team | Pld | T | G | FG | P |
|---|---|---|---|---|---|---|
| 2016–17 | Dewsbury Rams | 2 | 0 | 0 | 0 | 0 |
| 2016(loan) | → Hemel Stags | 1 | 0 | 0 | 0 | 0 |
| 2023 | London Skolars | 8 | 4 | 0 | 0 | 8 |
| 2024 | Hunslet RLFC | 1 | 0 | 0 | 0 | 0 |
| | Total | 12 | 4 | 0 | 0 | 8 |
- Source: As of 1 April 2025

Donald Kudangirana is a Zimbabwean professional rugby league footballer who currently plays for Hunslet RLFC in the RFL League 1. and previously Dewsbury Rams in the Kingstone Press Championship.

Kudangirana had previously spent time on loan at the Hemel Stags in Kingstone Press League 1.

In 2018 Kudangirana was handed a three-year and seven-month doping ban for testing positive for banned substances drostanolone and testosterone in 2016.

== Hunslet RLFC ==
On 13 Nov 2023 it was reported that he had signed for Hunslet RLFC in the RFL League 1
