= Oxford Cavaliers =

English amateur rugby league club, based in Oxford

Club information
- Full name: Oxford Cavaliers Rugby League
- Short name: Oxford
- Colours: Red and blue
- Founded: 1996; 30 years ago
- Website: https://www.pitchero.com/clubs/oxfordcavaliersrlfc/

Current details
- Ground: Oxford RFC, North Hinksey, Oxford
- Competition: Conference League South - 1st grade (from 2014); West of England Rugby League

Oxford Cavaliers Rugby League Football Club is the first amateur rugby league club formed in Oxford in the summer era.

For almost thirty years, the Cavaliers have coached and developed several players who have gone on to play the game both professionally and semi-professionally. Cavaliers juniors Mike Castle and Corey Simms both represented London Skolars, Jamie Cope joined Keighley Cougars, while Australians Barry Randall and Brad Smith both had a spell at Super League side, London Broncos (via Rochdale Hornets). Darrell Griffin, who started his rugby league career at the Cavaliers, went on to play for Huddersfield Giants in the Super League.

== History ==
The club was the brainchild of Rugby League Summer Conference founder and one time London Broncos CEO, Lionel Hurst, who chose the club's name and colours to honour the city's civil war heritage. The club's original crest was the blue and red royal standard of King Charles I who held court at Christ Church in the city during the English Civil War. The first and only other community Rugby League club in the city, Oxford Sharks RLFC, had folded in 1993.

The club's first ever competitive fixture, a 36-16 win over Bath RLFC on Sunday 14 July 1996, was played in the inaugural 'Summer Conference' - the forerunner to the 10-team Rugby League Conference which launched the following year. Over the coming months Oxford Cavaliers would become a founder member of the Rugby League Conference.

Following an impressive first season of competitive Rugby League, 1998 saw an expanded 14 team competition that pitted the Cavaliers against North London Skolars, St Albans Centurions, West London Sharks, and bitter rivals Crawley Jets. At season's end, no fewer than five Cavaliers had achieve honours with the Rugby League Conference Representative side. Former London Broncos Alliance players Graham Crane and Simon Hill were joined by Paul Daly, John Williams and Darrell Griffin in the 22-man squad for games against the North East and Combined Services representative teams.

1999 - The Cavaliers reach the regional final of the Rugby League Conference, and are awarded the title of Rugby League Conference Club of the Year. Props John Williams and Graham Crane, along with Kiwi fullback Steve Lacey, scrum half Simon Hill and centre Jon Flatman all receive representative honours.

Cavaliers versus Coventry Bears. The first Oxford Cavaliers Rugby League Conference game in 1996.

2000 - Oxford Cavaliers coach Dave Doran is appointed Head Coach of the Rugby League Conference representative side. The Cavaliers themselves finish a credible tenth place in the RLC composite table of 24 teams.

2001 - Founder and Chairman Lionel Hurst leaves Oxford Cavaliers and is appointed Chief Executive Officer of Super League club London Broncos.

2008 - Oxford finish second in the League; beating Telford Raiders, Coventry Bears, Swindon St George and Redditch Ravens in the process.

2011 - The Cavaliers join the newly formed RLC West of England division.

2012 - Oxford, coached by former Hull FC and Bradford Bulls wing Tevita Vaikona, claim the RLC West of England division title, defeating Somerset Vikings in the Grand Final.

2014 - Announced link up with professional side Oxford Rugby League with the club fielding two sides the senior side to play in Conference League South the highest division for southern clubs in the amateur game. In August 2014 the Cavaliers withdrew from the Conference League South

2022 - An Oxford Cavaliers women's team take part in the RFL Women's Super League South. They withdrew from the competition after one season.

== Club honours ==
Sam Hardy Memorial Trophy - 2007

Rugby League Conference West of England Champions - 2012

Rugby League Conference West of England Plate - 2016
