= Southern Conference League =

British rugby league

- Sport: Rugby league
- Instituted: 2012
- Ceased: 2025
- Replaced by: National Conference Southern
- Number of teams: 8
- Country: England
- Champions: Hammersmith Hills Hoists (2025)
- Most titles: Hammersmith Hills Hoists (4)

The Southern Conference League was the fourth tier of the British rugby league system. It was the highest level of amateur rugby league outside of the heartlands in Northern England, operating in The Midlands, Southern England, and Wales.

It was one of the many leagues that replaced the Rugby League Conference. The competition was first played between 2012 and 2016, and was relaunched in 2019 after a two-year hiatus.

For the 2026 season the league was incorporated into the National Community Rugby League following a wider restructure of amateur rugby league in the United Kingdom.

== History ==
The Southern Conference League was founded in 2013 as the Conference League South following the restructuring of amateur rugby league in Great Britain. Teams that had competed in the Rugby League Conference National Division in 2011 were moved to the newly formed and BARLA administered NCL Division Three with clubs drawn from all across England. However at the end of the inaugural season many southern and midlands clubs opted to leave the National Conference League structure and join the newly formed Conference League South for the 2013 season.

The Conference League South was created for sides outside the rugby league heartlands of the North of England that wanted a higher standard of rugby league than the Midlands Rugby League Premier Division or the South Premier but were not yet ready for the NCL. In 2013, the six teams to compete in the Conference League South were, Bristol Sonics, Nottingham Outlaws and St Albans Centurions from National Conference League Division 3; Leicester Storm and Northampton Demons were elevated from the premier division of Midlands Rugby League and Sheffield Hallam Eagles joined as a new side after the collapse of the Championship reserve under-23 division.

Northampton Demons and St Albans Centurions were replaced with Oxford Cavaliers and Valley Cougars in 2014 however Oxford Cavaliers failed to complete the season. Bristol Sonics dropped down to the West of England Rugby League in 2015 which allowed four new clubs to join; Gloucestershire Warriors, Coventry Bears Reserves, Torfaen Tigers and Raiders RL alongside the return of Oxford Cavaliers.

London Chargers were promoted to compete in 2016 alongside a new reserve side from University of Gloucestershire All Golds with Gloucestershire Warriors, Leicester Storm, Oxford Cavaliers and Sheffield Hallam Eagles dropping out.

At the end of the 2016 season, it was announced that the Conference League South season would not take place in 2017, and teams would return to their respective regional leagues. In May 2017, the RFL announced plans to introduce a new Southern League competition from 2018 onwards.

The Conference League South was reintroduced for the 2019 season as the Southern Conference League, split into geographic Eastern and Western divisions, with the Hammersmith Hills Hoists winning the first title under the tournament's new name. The 2020 season was abandoned due to the COVID-19 pandemic, but the competition resumed in 2021, with a maiden title for Wests Warriors beating local rivals London Chargers 20 points to 10.

For the 2023 season, the geographic split of the league has been removed with all teams in the divisions below being able to apply to enter the competition if they so wish. When the fixture list was released, only 8 teams have entered the division - All Golds, Bedford Tigers, Brentwood Eels, Eastern Rhinos, Hammersmith Hills Hoists, London Chargers, North Herts Crusaders, Wests Warriors.

== Clubs ==
Team	City	Ground
Bristol All Golds	Bristol	North Bristol RFC
Bedford Tigers	Bedford	Great Ouse Way
Brentwood Eels	Brentwood, Essex	Old Brentwoods RFC
Eastern Rhinos	Colchester	Mill Road Playing Fields
Hammersmith Hills Hoists	Chiswick, London	Chiswick RFC
London Chargers	Chiswick, London	Chiswick RFC
North Herts Crusaders	Hitchin	King George V Playing Fields
Wests Warriors	Acton, London	Twyford Avenue

Locations of Conference League South teams in England
Locations of Conference League South teams in London

== Results ==
The 2012 results refer to National Conference League 3.

Season	Grand Final Information		
Season	Champions	Score	Runners-up
2012	Hemel Stags	17–10	Huddersfield Underbank Rangers
2013	Sheffield Hallam Eagles	32–24	Nottingham Outlaws
2014	Valley Cougars	19–10	Sheffield Hallam Eagles
2015	Nottingham Outlaws	39–12	Valley Cougars
2016	London Chargers	42–0	Valley Cougars
2017	Hiatus		
2018	Hiatus		
2019	Hammersmith Hills Hoists	16–10	London Chargers
2020	Cancelled due to the COVID-19 pandemic		
2021	Wests Warriors	20–10	London Chargers
2022	Wests Warriors	20–12	London Chargers
2023	Hammersmith Hills Hoists	14–0	Wests Warriors
2024	Hammersmith Hills Hoists	12-6	Wests Warriors
2025	Hammersmith Hills Hoists	20-12	Wests Warriors

=== Winners ===
Club	Wins	Winning years
Hammersmith Hills Hoists	4	2019, 2023, 2024, 2025
Wests Warriors	2	2021, 2022
Hemel Stags	1	2012
Sheffield Hallam Eagles	1	2013
Valley Cougars	1	2014
Nottingham Outlaws	1	2015
London Chargers	1	2016

== Tables ==
=== 2021 ===
Western Conference										Eastern Conference									
POS	CLUB	P	W	L	D	PF	PA	DIFF	PTS	POS	CLUB	P	W	L	D	PF	PA	DIFF	PTS
1	Swindon St George	6	4	2	0	162	150	12	8	1	Wests Warriors	12	12	0	0	538	146	392	24
2	Valley Cougars	6	3	3	0	156	115	41	5	2	London Chargers	12	10	2	0	396	207	189	20
3	Devon Sharks	6	2	3	1	144	125	19	5	3	Hammersmith Hills Hoists	12	8	4	0	351	308	43	16
4	All Golds	6	2	3	1	114	186	-72	3	4	North Herts Crusaders	12	5	7	0	366	326	40	10
Deductions: Valley Cougars: 1 points for forfeit; All Golds: 2 point for two forfeits; Hemel Stags: 1 point for forfeit; South London Silverbacks: 1 point for forfeit										5	Bedford Tigers	11	5	6	0	274	298	-24	10
Deductions: Valley Cougars: 1 points for forfeit; All Golds: 2 point for two forfeits; Hemel Stags: 1 point for forfeit; South London Silverbacks: 1 point for forfeit										6	Eastern Rhinos	12	5	7	0	250	344	-94	10
Deductions: Valley Cougars: 1 points for forfeit; All Golds: 2 point for two forfeits; Hemel Stags: 1 point for forfeit; South London Silverbacks: 1 point for forfeit										7	Hemel Stags	11	1	10	0	139	423	-284	1
Deductions: Valley Cougars: 1 points for forfeit; All Golds: 2 point for two forfeits; Hemel Stags: 1 point for forfeit; South London Silverbacks: 1 point for forfeit										8	South London Silverbacks	10	0	10	0	132	394	-262	-1

Play Off

Preliminary Round
W3	Devon Sharks	22
E3	Hammersmith Hills Hoists	36
W1	Swindon St George	24
E5	Bedford Tigers	22
E2	London Chargers	56
E4	North Herts Crusaders	18

Semi Final
E1	Wests Warriors	36
E3	Hammersmith Hills Hoists	10
W1	Swindon St George	14
E2	London Chargers	52

Grand Final
E1	Wests Warriors	20
E2	London Chargers	10

=== 2022 ===
Western Conference										Eastern Conference									
POS	CLUB	P	W	L	D	PF	PA	DIFF	PTS	POS	CLUB	P	W	L	D	PF	PA	DIFF	PTS
1	All Golds	5	4	1	0	138	54	84	8	1	London Chargers	12	12	0	0	482	164	318	24
2	Torfaen Tigers	6	4	2	0	228	152	76	8	2	Wests Warriors	12	10	2	0	460	228	232	20
3	Swindon St George	6	2	4	0	146	188	-42	3	3	Brentwood Eels	12	5	7	0	210	316	-106	10
4	Devon Sharks	5	1	4	0	54	172	-118	2	4	Eastern Rhinos	12	4	8	0	238	290	-52	8
Deductions: Swindon St George: 1 point for forfeit; Hammersmith Hills Hoists: 1 point for forfeit										5	Bedford Tigers	12	4	8	0	220	314	-94	8
Deductions: Swindon St George: 1 point for forfeit; Hammersmith Hills Hoists: 1 point for forfeit										6	North Herts Crusaders	12	4	8	0	226	392	-166	8
Deductions: Swindon St George: 1 point for forfeit; Hammersmith Hills Hoists: 1 point for forfeit										7	Hammersmith Hills Hoists	12	3	9	0	228	360	-132	5

Playoffs

Play Off

Preliminary Round
W2	Torfaen Tigers	0
E3	Brentwood Eels	24
W1	Bristol All Golds	46
E4	Eastern Rhinos	6

Semi Final
E1	London Chargers	38
E3	Brentwood Eels	8
E2	Wests Warriors	46
W1	Bristol All Golds	12

Grand Final
E1	London Chargers	12
E2	Wests Warriors	20

=== 2023 ===
POS	CLUB	P	W	L	D	PF	PA	DIFF	PTS
1	Wests Warriors	14	13	1	0	690	126	564	26
2	Hammersmith Hills Hoists	14	13	1	0	470	150	320	26
3	London Chargers	14	10	4	0	466	184	282	20
4	Brentwood Eels	14	7	7	0	380	346	34	14
5	Bristol All Golds	14	6	8	0	280	424	-184	12
6	Eastern Rhinos	14	4	10	0	230	458	-228	8
7	North Herts Crusaders	14	2	12	0	146	502	-356	3
8	Bedford Tigers	14	1	13	0	154	586	-432	-1
Deductions: Bedford Tigers: 3 points for three forfeits; North Herts Crusaders: 1 point for forfeit

Play Off

Semi-final
1	Wests Warriors	38
4	Brentwood Eels	6
2	Hammersmith Hills Hoists	28
3	London Chargers	12

Grand final
Wests Warriors	0
Hammersmith Hills Hoists	14

=== 2024 ===
POS	CLUB	P	W	L	D	PF	PA	DIFF	PTS
1	Hammersmith Hills Hoists	12	11	0	1	460	104	356	23
2	Wests Warriors	12	10	2	0	582	150	432	20
3	London Chargers	12	8	3	1	308	226	82	17
4	Bristol All Golds	12	6	4	2	322	278	44	14
5	Eastern Rhinos	12	7	5	0	270	254	16	14
6	North Herts Crusaders	12	4	7	1	202	338	-136	9
7	Bedford Tigers	12	3	9	0	238	490	-252	6
8	Brentwood Eels	12	2	9	1	180	320	-140	5
9	London Skolars	12	0	12	0	74	476	-402	0

Deductions

- London Skolars: Withdrew partway into season. All remaining fixtures rewarded 24-0 to opponents.

Play Off

Semi-final
1	Hammersmith Hills Hoists	64
4	Bristol All Golds	4
2	Wests Warriors	26
3	London Chargers	8

Grand final
Hammersmith Hills Hoists	12
Wests Warriors	6

=== 2025 ===
POS	CLUB	P	W	L	D	PF	PA	DIFF	PTS
1	Wests Warriors	14	13	1	0	556	163	393	26
2	Hammersmith Hills Hoists	14	12	2	0	532	132	400	24
3	Bedford Tigers	14	9	5	0	462	286	176	18
4	London Chargers	14	8	6	0	317	292	25	16
5	Bristol All Golds	14	6	8	0	310	486	-176	12
6	Eastern Rhinos	14	3	11	0	202	532	-330	6
7	Brentwood Eels	14	2	11	1	212	438	-226	4
8	North Herts Crusaders	14	2	11	1	216	478	-262	2

Deductions

- North Herts Crusaders: 1 points, Forfeit
- North Herts Crusaders: 1 points, Forfeit
- North Herts Crusaders: 1 points, Forfeit
- Brentwood Eels: 1 points, Forfeit

Play Off

Semi-final
1	Wests Warriors	60
4	London Chargers	6
2	Hammersmith Hills Hoists	30
3	Bedford Tigers	10

Grand final
1	Wests Warriors	12
2	Hammersmith Hills Hoists	20

== See also ==
- National Conference League
- Conference Challenge Trophy
