= Bristol Sonics =

English amateur rugby league club

- Concorde

Club information
- Full name: Bristol Sonics; Rugby League Club
- Nickname: Sonics
- Colours: Maroon, gold and white
- Founded: 2002; 24 years ago
- Website: bristolsonics.com

Current details
- Ground: Landseer Avenue
- Coach: Dom Swann
- Captain: Tom Howley
- Competition: West of England Rugby League

Bristol Sonics are a rugby league club based in Bristol in the South West of England.

The Sonics' first team plays in the Conference League South competition, having previously played in the now defunct Rugby League Conference Midlands Premier division. Bristol Sonics A play in the West of England Rugby League.

The Sonics also run two social touch rugby teams, the Subsonics, and a number of Junior sides around Bristol and South Gloucestershire.

== History ==
=== 2002–2004: Early Days ===
During the 1980s, and early '90s, there was an amateur club, based in Bristol, playing in the now defunct Midlands and South West Amateur Rugby League Association (MASWARLA). With the 100-year conflict between rugby union and rugby league still on-going, the club struggled to attract and retain players, with most regular players appearing under pseudonyms in order to avoid a lifetime ban from playing rugby union. The club was eventually disbanded.

Then, in 2002, an official from the Rugby Football League contacted Phil Cole, a local rugby league enthusiast, to ask whether he was interested in launching a new club in Bristol. Cole did just that, posting messages on Internet forums asking anyone interested to come to a meeting. In September 2002 Bristol Sonics were formed by this group of rugby league enthusiasts at Horts pub in Bristol city centre. The club colours of maroon and gold were chosen as a tribute to Bristol's original rugby league club. The Sonics name comes from Bristol's links with the development of the Concorde supersonic passenger jet, which was built and tested close to the club's original ground of St Brendans Old Boys in Filton.

Bristol Sonics were granted membership of the Rugby League Conference in January 2003, taking their place in the South West Division alongside Gloucestershire Warriors, Somerset Vikings, Worcester Saints, Cardiff Demons and Oxford Cavaliers. Before training began in February 2003, the Sonics agreed to host a heat of London Broncos' (now Harlequins RL 'Prop Idol' competition. One of the Bristol winners, Michael Lowis, was announced as one of the three finalists and went on to train with the Broncos.

Bristol Sonics initially struggled to attract players. Just 14 players, a couple borrowed from other clubs, took to the field for the Sonics' first game, a friendly against Cardiff Demons on Sunday 27 April 2003. The inexperienced Sonics lost to their local rivals 8–74, with captain Ben Morris getting Bristol's first ever try – a moment captured by a photographer from the Bristol Evening Post. This first Conference season proved tough for the Sonics, with an opening weekend win against Worcester Saints being followed by a series of heavy defeats, including one 8–100 loss to Cardiff – still the club's record defeat. At the end of the summer 2003 campaign, the Sonics finished bottom of the South West Division, having won just two of 10 matches.

For the 2004 Rugby League Conference season, national expansion and restructure found Bristol Sonics placed in the new Western division of the RLC. Cardiff Demons were replaced with Telford Raiders in an otherwise unchanged division. While the Sonics improved and won more matches – including their first ever away win, a 30–48 victory over Oxford Cavaliers – they still struggled on and off the pitch. Brief relief came in the form of a second successive trip to the York International 9s in June, where the Sonics made the quarter-finals, securing a victory over French side Montpellier along the way. At the end of the season, St Brendans Old Boys RFC had sold their ground to developers. This meant the Sonics would have to find a new home base before the start of the 2005 campaign. In the end, with no other alternative, the Sonics found themselves a new home at Old Elizabethans RFC in Hallen.

=== 2005–2006 ===
After the steady improvements of 2004, 2005 was another hit-and-miss year for the Sonics on the pitch. Things started badly when the RFL announced on the eve of the season that one of the South West Division's new clubs, Thames Valley Cougars, would not be entering the league. This withdrawal caused all sorts of problems for the remaining five South West clubs, with the number of gap weekends being the biggest. On top of this, Oxford Cavaliers and new club Plymouth Titans both had trouble fulfilling fixtures. Both scratched games in Bristol early in the season. For the second year running the Sonics won more games than they lost, eventually finishing third. The undoubted highlight of a troublesome year was a memorable 30-all draw with Somerset, watched by a reporter from BBC Radio Bristol.

For the 2006 summer season, Bristol moved grounds again, finding a home at Aretians RFC in Little Stoke, South Gloucestershire. Player recruitment had not gone well and suddenly the Sonics found themselves going backwards. In an expanded West Midlands & South West Division of 8 clubs, Bristol won only three games all season, and player disillusionment led to the forfeiting of a game against rivals Gloucestershire Warriors – the only time this has happened in the club's history. The one bright spot was the formation of the club's first junior side, the under-16 'Sonic Youth' team.

=== 2007–2009 ===
The 2007 season saw Bristol Sonics celebrate their fifth anniversary by becoming the winners of the new-look RLC West Midlands Division. After a slow start to the campaign, the new-look Sonics began to gel as a side. After the regular league stage of the season, the Sonics finished second to Burntwood Barbarians after going through the second half of the campaign unbeaten. That meant a home qualifying play-off against third-placed Coventry Bears Academy. Bristol triumphed 70–8 to earn a Grand Final showdown with Burntwood on 11 August 2007. In a contest at Chase High School, Burntwood, Bristol triumphed 40–30 to become West Midlands Champions – the club's first significant silverware. The following week, Bristol travelled to RLC East Division winners Bedford Tigers for an RLC regional quarter-final. Despite leading for much of the game, the Sonics were eventually beaten 22–18 to put an end to their hopes of further silverware.

Bristol Sonics carried their fine 2007 form into the 2008 season, remaining unbeaten in the West Midlands Regional Conference with 11 wins and a draw. Their remarkable run included a record 98–18 win over Redditch Ravens and a nailbiting 24-all draw with Coventry Bears 'A', as well as a dramatic, last-minute victory over long-time rivals Oxford Cavaliers on the final day of the league season. The Sonics were once again crowned West Midlands Champions.

As West Midlands Champions, the Sonics took part in the Rugby League Conference play-offs for the second year in a row. After receiving a bye in the quarter-finals, Bristol faced East Division winners Hainault Bulldogs in the semi-finals at Gloucestershire Warriors' Chosen Hill Ground. After an even first half, the Sonics powered away from the Bulldogs in the second half to win 34–14 and book a place in their first Rugby League Conference Grand Final. That match was played at Derby City RLFC's Haslams ground, and saw Bristol take on Moorends Thorne Moor Marauders from Doncaster. The more experienced Marauders proved too much for the Sonics, who fell 18–0 behind after just 15 minutes. A spirited second-half fightback from Bristol saw them outscore their opponents, but it wasn't enough to pull off a famous upset. Marauders won 38–20.

The Sonics' success in winning the West Midlands Division and reaching the national Grand Final earned them a record number of nominations at the annual Rugby League Conference Awards. At the ceremony in November, Bristol were named Rugby League Conference Team of the Year 2008. In December, the Sonics were invited by the Rugby Football League to enter the 2009 Challenge Cup. On 18 October, Bristol Sonics were drawn at home in the preliminary round against British student champions Leeds Met Carnegie University. The game was played in January 2009 at Aretians RFC in Little Stoke, Bristol. Bristol opened the try scoring, but ended up losing 52–8 to the students.

2009 saw Bristol Sonics move up a division for the first time. Following their success the previous year, they were granted a place in the Rugby League Conference Midlands Premier division. They enjoyed an unremarkable debut season, finishing mid table.

=== 2010-2011: RLC Midlands Premier success ===
In 2010, Bristol Sonics finished second in the Rugby League Conference Midlands Premier Division table. After winning a play-off semi-final against Leicester Storm 16–8 at Aretians, they travelled to Old Coventrians to take on Minor Premiers Coventry Bears in the divisional Grand Final. After a topsy-turvy game in which both sides led for periods, Bristol went into the last 10 minutes trailing by four points. A try five minutes from time by substitute Dan Wegryzn levelled the scores. At full-time, the teams were drawn on 20 points each. A period of golden point extra time was played. Bristol's captain Dom Swann saw a field goal attempt drift inches wide before Coventry's Luke Watts scored to give the bears a narrow 24–20 extra time win.

In August 2010, it was announced that Bristol Sonics head coach Karl Fearnley had been named Coach of the Year at the Rugby Football League's National Volunteer Awards.

With Champions Coventry Bears having stepped up to the Rugby League Conference National, Bristol Sonics found themselves favourites for the 2011 Rugby League Conference Midlands Premier division title. After a slow start to the campaign, including losses to Northampton and Leicester, the Sonics eventually finished top of the table, earning a "home" Grand Final against Leicester Storm at Aretians. The Sonics led 16–8 at half time and eventually ran out 28–20 winners, with long serving captain Dom Swann being named man of the match. Former Bristol player Simon Anniss scored twice for the visitors. The Sonics win earned them a shot at the prestigious Harry Jepson Trophy. They played North West champions Accrington & Leyland Lions in Birmingham in the quarter-final, but were beaten in a fiery contest.

2011 also saw the debut of Bristol Sonics A, the club's second team. They enjoyed a successful first season, coming second in the West of England Division of the Rugby League Conference behind old rivals Gloucestershire Warriors. The summer of 2011 also saw the launch of the Bristol Junior Rugby League competition, featuring four under 14s sides spread across the city and South Gloucestershire. North West Eagles, coached by Dom Swann and Ross Bergin, were the first winners.

== Juniors ==
Bristol Sonics run the Bristol Junior Rugby League, which features a number of junior sides based in different parts of Bristol and South Gloucestershire.

== Club honours ==
- RLC West Midlands Division: 2007, 2008
- RLC Midlands Premier: 2011
