= Valley Cougars =

Welsh rugby league club, based in Treharris, South Wales

Club information
- Full name: Valley Cougars R.L.F.C.
- Colours: Sky Blue and Pink
- Founded: 2001; 25 years ago
- Website: www.pitchero.com/clubs/valleycougars

Current details
- Ground: Treharris RFC, Merthyr
- Coach: Paul Emanuelli
- Competition: Conference League South
- 2021: 1st

Valley Cougars were a rugby league team based in Treharris. They played in the Wales Premier League, which they won in 2017 after defeating the Torfaen Tigers in the league's Grand Final.

== History ==
They were founded in 2001 as Cynon Valley Cougars and joined the Welsh Division of the Rugby League Conference in 2003. After their debut season in the Welsh Division they dropped Cynon from their name They led a nomadic existence for their first few years in the valleys playing out of places like Pontyclun, Abercynon and Sardis Road, Pontypridd, Nelson and Treharris . They won the Welsh Premier in 2008 and 2010. In 2011, they were promoted to the Rugby League Conference National Division. In 2014 they moved to the Conference League South and after finishing runners up in the league they went on to beat Sheffield Hallam Eagles in the grand final in their debut season. 2015 saw them claim top spot in the league but they lost the grand final to Nottingham Outlaws

== Club honours ==
- RLC Welsh Premier champions: 2003, 2008, 2010, 2017
- Conference League South champions: 2014

== See also ==
- Rugby League in Wales
- Wales Rugby League
- List of rugby league clubs in Britain
