= Gloucestershire Warriors =

English rugby league club

Gloucestershire Warriors RLFC

Club information
- Full name: Gloucestershire Warriors RLFC
- Colours: Red and black
- Founded: 1997; 28 years ago
- Website: www.gloucestershirewarriors.co.uk

Current details
- Ground(s): Oxstalls Sports Park
- Chairman: Chris Wilson
- Coach: Richard Jones
- Competition: Conference League South
- 2015: 7th

Gloucestershire Warriors RLFC are a rugby league team from the county of Gloucestershire in England. They play in the Conference League South and in 2006 made their debut in the Challenge Cup.

== History ==
Cheltenham Warriors were formed in 1997 and took part in the second season of the Rugby League Conference. They played at the Prince of Wales Stadium in Cheltenham, chosen as the venue for the inaugural Grand Final of the conference. Warriors won the Central Division in their second season in 1999.

In 2000, the club moved to a new home at Chosen Hill Former Pupils RFC and changed its name to the Gloucestershire Warriors to reflect the fact that it was attracting players from throughout the county.

In 2005, the club won the South West Division defeating Somerset Vikings in the final and reached the RLC Regional final; losing to Wetherby Bulldogs. As a result of their efforts in 2005, in 2006 the club was invited to take part in the Challenge Cup and, despite the early rounds being in the off-season for conference teams, took the opportunity to play in the famous competition. In the preliminary round they were drawn away to Pennine League team Illingworth and on a famous day in January beat them by 25-24. In the next round they faced stronger opposition in the St. Helens club Blackbrook, this time at home. The visitors proved too strong but the Warriors gained respectability in the score of 20-36. This cup run gained the club unprecedented national media coverage and augured well for the season in the West Midlands and South West division of the Conference.

The 2006 season saw the Warriors beaten only once in the regular season, finishing top of the West Midlands and South West division and qualifying first for the play-offs. They beat rivals Somerset Vikings twice in the play-offs to qualify for the national quarter-finals. After a walkover against Broadstairs, they lost a semi-final against Thorne Moor Marauders, the winners of the North Midlands division. Also in 2006, the Sonics finished as runners-up to Liban Espoir in the Bristol & SW Nines.

In 2007 the Warriors stepped up to the Midlands Premier division, finishing in third place behind Coventry Bears and Nottingham Outlaws, to whom they lost in the play-offs.

The Warriors failed to reach the play-offs in the 2008 season for the first time in many years. The following season the side again failed to reach the post-season play although they did field a number of young players.

The 2010 season saw the Warriors on the move and a new home was found at Old Richians RFC just outside Gloucester. Work off the field stepped up with two junior sides being formed, the Gloucester Meteors and the Cheltenham All Golds with plans to begin a West of England Junior Rugby League. Gloucestershire made their second appearance in the Challenge Cup, falling 36-32 to the Edinburgh Eagles in the first round proper.

Gloucestershire Warriors joined the newly formed RLC West of England division for the 2011 season. They went through the league campaign undefeated and were only beaten in the semi-finals of the RLC regional trophy by eventual champions Elmbridge Eagles. In 2014 they won the West Of England Rugby League Grand Final by beating Swindon St George.

In 2015 the club moved up to the Conference League South finishing 7th

== Club honours ==
- RLC Western Division: 1999
- RLC South West Division: 2005
- RLC West Midlands and South West Division: 2006
- RLC West of England: 2011
- West Of England RL: 2014
