= London Chargers =

English amateur rugby league club, based in Clapham, South London

Club information
- Full name: London Chargers Rugby League Football Club
- Nickname: Chargers
- Colours: Maroon and blue
- Founded: 17 January 2013; 13 years ago

Current details
- Ground: Clapham Common, Clapham, London
- Chairman: James Jones
- Coach: Ade Aderiye & Marcus Stock
- Captain: Doug Chirnside
- Competition: Southern Conference League

London Chargers R.L.F.C. are a rugby league side based in South West London who currently (2025) compete in the Southern Conference League, a tier 4 competition. They were known as the South West London Chargers until November 2015. They were formed in 2013 as a merger between West London Sharks and South London Storm and formerly competed in the London Premier (South Premier)

== History ==
South West London Chargers were formed on 17 January 2013 from the merger of South London Storm and West London Sharks. The newly merged side was based in Clapham Common.

The club entered a team in the London Premier men's competition and a second men's team in the London Entry League. The club ran a women's team in the South East England competition.

Chargers went on to win the London Premier and the Harry Jepson three years in a row - 2013 - 15.

In December 2015, the club announced a rebrand to 'London Chargers' and competed in the Conference League South, the highest level of amateur rugby league in the south of Britain. Their A team moved up to the London Premier competition to replace the first team. Chargers won the CLS in 2016, but after the season the CLS folded and Chargers had to go back to the London Premier. In 2017 they made it to the London Premier final but lost to Hammersmith Hills Hoists.

In 2018 Chargers drew local long term rivals Hammersmith in the 1st round of the Challenge Cup and avenged the Grand Final defeat winning 18–0. But in the London Premier season, Chargers once again came up just short against Hammersmith losing in the Grand Final.

In 2019 Chargers made the Grand Final of the newly formed Southern Conference League, once again against Hammersmith Hills Hoists. They drew 12-12 and won away 16–34 against the Hoists in the season. But when it came to the Grand Final, Chargers went down 16–10. The rivalry continues...

The 2020 season was cancelled due to COVID-19.

In 2021 Chargers made the Grand Final against Wests Warriors, but went down 20–10 in Rosslyn Park.

In 2022 Chargers made the Grand Final against Wests Warriors, however went down again in a nailbiter.

In 2023 Chargers won the London Premier competition beating Medway Dragons 38–16 at London Skolars. This was the first time the Chargers won the competition with their second team. The previous threepeat (2013–15) was done with their first team. Unfortunately the first team was not as successful this year, getting knocked out in the semi-final of the Southern Conference League to a strong Hammersmith Hills Hoist who went on to win the competition by beating Wests Warriors in the Grand Final.

In 2024 Chargers aim to continue with running two men's team.

Chargers has run two men's teams since inception in 2013.

== Founding members ==
- (England) Adam Tran
- (Australia) Cameron Paul
- (England) Craig Monteiro
- (Australia) Damian Mohan
- (New Zealand) Donny Lam
- (England) John Paul Byrnes
- (Australia) Mark Barnes
- (England) Mark Clune
- (Australia) Nathan Brown
- (New Zealand) Rob McLean
- (Australia) Ryan Massingham

== Coaching and management staff 2023 ==
- Head Coach: (Australia) Marty Hyde
- Team Manager: (Australia) Deon Stephenson
- Chairman: (England) Craig Monteiro
- Secretary: (Australia) Todd Peut
- Treasurer: (Scotland) Jamie Park

== Chairman ==
- 2013 - 2017: (Australia) Cam Paul
- 2018–2023: (England) Craig Monteiro
- 2024–present: (Wales) James Jones

== Head coach ==
- 2013 - 2014: (Australia) Mark Barnes
- 2015: (England) Richard Knight and (Australia) Kane Stannard
- 2016 - 2017: (Australia) Mark Barnes
- 2018 - 2021: (Australia) Todd Peut
- 2022: (Australia) Mark Barnes
- 2023-2024: (Australia) Marty Hyde
- 2025 - Present: (England) Ade Aderiye & (England) Marcus Stock

== Barnes-Paul (Club-man) award ==
- 2013: (England) Craig Monteiro and (England) Mark Clune
- 2014: (England) Mark Clune
- 2015: (England) Paul Handley
- 2016: (England) Paul Handley
- 2017: (Malta) Joe Briggs
- 2018: (England) Mike Butcher
- 2019: (New Zealand) Mike Chivers
- 2021: (Wales) James Jones

== Club honours ==
- London Premier Champions: 2023
- Conference League South: 2016
- South Premier Champions: 2013, 2014, and 2015 (three times)
- London and South East Cup: 2013 (one time)
- Harry Jepson Trophy: 2013, 2014, and 2015 (three times)
- South Premier Minor Premiers: 2014, and 2015
- Brighton 9's: 2014, and 2015 (two times)
- Challenge Cup: 2014 - Round 2, 2015 - Round 1, 2016 - Round 1, 2017 - Round 2, 2018 - Round 2, 2019 - Round 1, 2020 - Round 1
- London and South East Entry League Minor Premiers: 2013 (one time)
- London Rugby League "Club of the Year": 2014

== Challenge Cup ==
- 2014 Round 1: Torfaen Tigers (home) 12-6 W
- 2014 Round 2: Milford Marlins (home) 6-24 L
- 2015 Round 1: Widnes West Bank (away) 14-10 L
- 2016 Round 1: Shaw Cross Sharks (home) 14-22 L
- 2017 Round 1: Bridgend Blue Bulls (home) 116-0 W
- 2017 Round 2: Fryston Warriors (home) 12-40 L
- 2018 Round 1: Hammersmith Hills Hoists (home) 18-0 W
- 2018 Round 2: Army (away) 24-16 L
- 2019 Round 1: Wath Brow Hornets (home) 6-34 L
- 2020 Round 1: Rochdale Mayfield (away) 32-12 L
- 2021 - Amateur teams not entered due to COVID-19
- 2022 Round 1: Ellenborough Rangers (home) 22-16 W
- 2022 Round 2: London Skolars (away) 40-22 L
- 2023 Round 1: North Herts Crusaders (home) 38 - 12 W
- 2023 Round 2: Wests Warriors (away) 18 - 14 L
- 2025 Round 1: Oulton Raiders (home)
