= Northampton Demons =

English amateur rugby league club

Club information
- Full name: Northampton Demons; Rugby League Football Club
- Colours: Yellow with black and white trim
- Founded: 2007; 19 years ago
- Exited: 2018; 8 years ago
- Website: www.northamptonrl.co.uk

Former details
- Ground: Duston Sports Centre

Northampton Demons was a rugby league club based in Duston, Northampton. They played in the RFL Midlands Rugby League Men's South Division.

== History ==
=== Northampton Casuals ===
The club was founded in 2007 as the Northampton Casuals and was accepted into the London League operating on a Merit League basis.

In 2008, the club joined the Eastern Division of the 2008 Rugby League Conference. They won the division in 2009 and went on to win the RLC Regional title by beating Jarrow Vikings.

=== Northampton Demons ===
In 2010, the club changed their name to the Northampton Demons and retained the RLC Regional title by defeating Parkside Hawks in the final.

In 2014 and 2015, the Demons won consecutive Midlands Premier Division titles.

In 2018 the club folded due to low player numbers.

== Club honours ==
- RLC East Division: 2009, 2010
- RLC Regional: 2009, 2010
- Midlands Rugby League Premier Division: 2012, 2014 and 2015
