= List of England national rugby league team results =

The following list is a complete collection of results for the England national rugby league team:

Note

- Prior to 2007 England was mainly represented by Great Britain, with the exception of World Cup games from 1995 and the European Championship. As a result, minimal games were played as England against non-European opposition.
- A "Test Match" is a friendly that contributes to the world rankings. Test matches have been referred to as "Senior International Matches" by the International Rugby League since 2020.

== All-time records ==
Country	Matches	Won	Drawn	Lost
Aotearoa Māori	1	0	1	0
Australasia	3	2	0	1
Australia	28	7	2	19
(Australia) Combined Affiliated States	1	1	0	0
Cumbria	1	0	1	0
Exiles	4	2	0	2
Fiji	3	3	0	0
France	52	43	2	7
Ireland	3	3	0	0
Italy	1	0	0	1
Lebanon	1	1	0	0
New Zealand	20	9	1	10
Other Nationalities	16	8	1	7
Papua New Guinea	4	4	0	0
Russia	3	3	0	0
Samoa	3	3	0	0
Scotland	1	1	0	0
South Africa	1	1	0	0
Tonga	3	3	0	0
United States	1	1	0	0
Wales	69	50	2	17
Total	219	145	10	64

Win Draw Loss

== 1900s ==
	Date	Home	Score	Away	Competition	Location	Attendance
1	5 April 1904	England	3–9	Other Nationalities	Friendly	(England) Central Park, Wigan	6,000
2	2 January 1905	England	26–11	Other Nationalities	Friendly	(England) Bradford F.C., Bradford	6,000
3	1 January 1906	England	3–3	Other Nationalities	Friendly	(England) Central Park, Wigan	8,000
4	11 January 1908	England	18–16	New Zealand	1907–08 New Zealand tour of Great Britain	(England) Central Park, Wigan	12,000
5	20 April 1908	Wales	35–18	England	Friendly	(Wales) Athletic Ground, Aberdare	12,000
6	28 December 1908	England	31–7	Wales	Friendly	(England) Wheater's Field, Broughton	4,000
7	4 December 1909	England	19–13	Wales	Friendly	(England) Belle Vue, Wakefield	4,000

== 1910s ==
	Date	Home	Score	Away	Competition	Location	Attendance
8	9 April 1910	Wales	39–18	England	Friendly	(Wales) Bridgend Field, Ebbw Vale	4,000
9	10 December 1910	England	39–13	Wales	Friendly	(England) Butts Park Arena, Coventry	5,000
10	1 April 1911	Wales	8–27	England	Friendly	(Wales) Bridgend Field, Ebbw Vale	4,000
11	18 October 1911	England	6–11	Australasia	1911–12 Kangaroo tour of Great Britain	(England) Craven Cottage, Fulham	6,000
12	6 December 1911	England	5–3	Australasia	1911–12 Kangaroo tour of Great Britain	(England) Meadow Lane, Nottingham	3,000
13	20 January 1912	England	31–5	Wales	Friendly	(England) Watersheddings, Oldham	8,000
14	15 February 1913	England	40–16	Wales	Friendly	(England) South Devon Place, Plymouth	8,000
15	14 February 1914	England	16–12	Wales	Friendly	(England) Knowsley Road, St. Helens	10,000

== 1920s ==
	Date	Home	Score	Away	Competition	Location	Attendance
16	19 January 1921	England	35–9	Wales	Friendly	(England) Headingley, Leeds	13,000
17	5 February 1921	England	33–16	Other Nationalities	Friendly	(England) Lonsdale Park, Workington	10,000
18	10 October 1921	England	5–4	Australasia	1921–22 Kangaroo tour of Great Britain	(England) Highbury Stadium, London	12,000
19	11 December 1922	England	12–7	Wales	Friendly	(England) Herne Hill Stadium, London	3,000
20	7 February 1923	England	2–13	Wales	Friendly	(England) Central Park, Wigan	12,000
21	1 November 1923	England	18–11	Wales	Friendly	(England) Fartown Ground, Huddersfield	11,000
22	15 October 1924	England	17–23	Other Nationalities	Friendly	(England) Headingley, Leeds	3,000
23	7 February 1925	England	27–22	Wales	Friendly	(England) Lonsdale Park, Workington	14,000
24	30 September 1925	England	18–14	Wales	Friendly	(England) Central Park, Wigan	12,000
25	4 February 1926	England	37–11	Other Nationalities	Friendly	(England) Recreation Ground, Whitehaven	7,000
26	12 April 1926	Wales	22–30	England	Friendly	(Wales) Taff Vale Park, Pontypridd	23,000
27	6 April 1927	England	11–8	Wales	Friendly	(England) Wheater's Field, Broughton	6,000
28	11 January 1928	England	20–12	Wales	Friendly	(England) Central Park, Wigan	12,000
29	14 November 1928	Wales	15–39	England	Friendly	(Wales) Sloper Road Greyhound Stadium, Cardiff	15,000
30	20 March 1929	England	27–20	Other Nationalities	Friendly	(England) Headingley, Leeds	5,000

== 1930s ==
	Date	Home	Score	Away	Competition	Location	Attendance
31	7 April 1930	England	19–35	Other Nationalities	Friendly	(England) Thrum Hall, Halifax	2,300
32	1 October 1930	England	31–18	Other Nationalities	Friendly	(England) Knowsley Road, St. Helens	10,000
33	18 March 1931	England	23–18	Wales	Friendly	(England) Fartown Ground, Huddersfield	6,000
34	27 January 1932	England	19–2	Wales	Friendly	(England) The Willows, Salford	8,000
35	30 November 1932	England	14–13	Wales	Friendly	(England) Headingley, Leeds	4,000
36	30 March 1933	England	34–27	Other Nationalities	Friendly	(England) Lonsdale Park, Workington	11,000
37	31 December 1933	Australia	63–13	England	Friendly	(France) Stade Pershing, Paris	8,000
38	13 January 1934	England	19–14	Australia	Friendly	(England) Redheugh Park, Gateshead	15,576
39	15 April 1934	France	21–32	England	Friendly	(France) Stade Buffalo, Paris	20,000
40	28 March 1935	France	15–15	England	1935 European Cup	(France) Stade Buffalo, Paris	18,000
41	10 April 1935	England	24–11	Wales	1935 European Cup	(England) Stanley Athletic Grounds, Liverpool	7,100
42	1 February 1936	England	14–17	Wales	1935–36 European Cup	(England) Craven Park, Hull	17,000
43	16 February 1936	France	7–25	England	1935–36 European Cup	(France) Stade Buffalo, Paris	25,000
44	7 November 1936	Wales	3–2	England	1936–37 European Cup	(Wales) Taff Vale Park, Pontypridd	12,000
45	10 April 1937	England	23–9	France	1936–37 European Cup	(England) Thrum Hall, Halifax	7,024
46	29 January 1938	England	6–7	Wales	1938 European Cup	(England) Odsal Stadium, Bradford	8,637
47	20 March 1938	France	15–17	England	1938 European Cup	(France) Stade Buffalo, Paris	18,000
48	5 November 1938	Wales	17–9	England	1938–39 European Cup	(Wales) Stebonheath Park, Llanelli	17,000
49	25 February 1939	England	9–12	France	1938–39 European Cup	(England) Knowsley Road, St. Helens	10,000
50	23 December 1939	England	3–16	Wales	Friendly	(England) Odsal Stadium, Bradford	15,257

== 1940s ==
	Date	Home	Score	Away	Competition	Venue	Attendance
51	16 April 1940	England	5–8	Wales	Friendly	(England) Watersheddings, Oldham	5,000
52	18 October 1941	England	9–9	Wales	Friendly	(England) Odsal Stadium, Bradford	4,339
53	27 February 1943	England	15–9	Wales	Friendly	(England) Central Park, Wigan	17,000
54	26 February 1944	England	9–9	Wales	Friendly	(England) Central Park, Wigan	16,028
55	10 March 1945	England	18–8	Wales	Friendly	(England) Central Park, Wigan	24,000
56	24 November 1945	Wales	11–3	England	1945–46 European Cup	(Wales) St Helens Rugby Ground, Swansea	30,000
57	23 February 1946	England	16–6	France	1945–46 European Cup	(England) Station Road, Swinton	20,000
58	12 October 1946	England	10–13	Wales	1946–47 European Cup	(England) Station Road, Swinton	20,203
59	16 November 1946	Wales	5–19	England	1946–47 European Cup	(Wales) St Helens Rugby Ground, Swansea	25,000
60	8 December 1946	France	0–3	England	1946–47 European Cup	(France) Stade Chaban–Delmas, Bordeaux	24,100
61	17 May 1947	England	5–2	France	1946–47 European Cup	(England) Headingley, Leeds	21,000
62	20 September 1947	England	8–10	Wales	1947–48 European Cup	(England) Central Park, Wigan	27,000
63	25 October 1947	England	20–15	France	1947–48 European Cup	(England) Fartown Ground, Huddersfield	14,175
64	6 December 1947	Wales	7–18	England	1947–48 European Cup	(Wales) St Helens Rugby Ground, Swansea	10,000
65	11 April 1948	France	10–25	England	1947–48 European Cup	(France) Stade Velodrome, Marseille	32,000
66	22 September 1948	England	11–5	Wales	1948–49 European Cup	(England) Central Park, Wigan	12,638
67	28 November 1948	France	5–12	England	1948–49 European Cup	(France) Stade Chaban–Delmas, Bordeaux	26,000
68	5 February 1949	Wales	14–10	England	1948–49 European Cup	(Wales) St Helens Rugby Ground, Swansea	9,553
69	12 March 1949	England	5–12	France	1948–49 European Cup	(England) Wembley Stadium, London	12,382
70	19 September 1949	England	7–13	Other Nationalities	1949–50 European Cup	(England) Borough Park, Workington	17,576
71	4 December 1949	France	7–13	England	1949–50 European Cup	(France) Stade Chaban–Delmas, Bordeaux	20,598

== 1950s ==
	Date	Home	Score	Away	Competition	Venue	Attendance
72	1 March 1950	England	11–6	Wales	1949–50 European Cup	(England) Central Park, Wigan	28,000
73	14 October 1950	Wales	4–22	England	1950–51 European Cup	(Wales) Abertillery Leisure Centre, Abertillery	8,000
74	11 November 1950	England	14–9	France	1950–51 European Cup	(England) Headingley, Leeds	22,000
75	11 April 1951	England	10–35	Other Nationalities	1950–51 European Cup	(England) Central Park, Wigan	16,860
76	19 September 1951	England	35–11	Wales	1951–52 European Cup	(England) Knowsley Road, St. Helens	20,918
77	25 November 1951	France	42–13	England	1951–52 European Cup	(France) Stade Velodrome, Marseille	31,810
78	23 April 1952	England	31–18	Other Nationalities	1951–52 European Cup	(England) Central Park, Wigan	19,785
79	17 November 1952	England	19–8	Wales	1952–53 European Cup	(England) Central Park, Wigan	13,503
80	18 October 1952	England	12–31	Other Nationalities	1952–53 European Cup	(England) Fartown Ground, Huddersfield	20,459
81	11 April 1953	France	13–15	England	1952–53 European Cup	(France) Parc des Princes, Paris	25,000
82	16 September 1953	England	24–5	Wales	1953–54 European Cup	(England) Knowsley Road, St. Helens	19,357
83	7 November 1953	England	7–5	France	1953–54 European Cup	(England) Odsal Stadium, Bradford	10,659
84	28 November 1953	England	30–22	Other Nationalities	1953–54 European Cup	(England) Central Park, Wigan	19,012
85	12 September 1955	England	16–33	Other Nationalities	1955–56 European Cup	(England) Central Park, Wigan	18,232
86	10 May 1956	France	23–9	England	1955–56 European Cup	(France) Stade de Gerland, Lyon	?

== 1960s ==
	Date	Home	Score	Away	Competition	Venue	Attendance
87	17 November 1962	England	18–6	France	Friendly	(England) Headingley, Leeds	11,099
88	7 November 1968	England	17–24	Wales	Friendly	(England) The Willows, Salford	6,002
89	18 October 1969	England	40–23	Wales	1969–70 European Cup	(England) Headingley, Leeds	8,355
90	25 October 1969	England	11–11	France	1969–70 European Cup	(England) Central Park, Wigan	4,568

== 1970s ==
	Date	Home	Score	Away	Competition	Venue	Attendance
91	24 February 1970	England	26–7	Wales	1969–70 European Cup	(England) Headingley, Leeds	9,393
92	15 March 1970	France	14–9	England	1969–70 European Cup	(France) Stade Municipal, Toulouse	6,587
93	19 January 1975	France	9–11	England	1975 European Cup	(France) Stade Gilbert Brutus, Perpignan	7,950
94	25 February 1975	England	12–8	Wales	1975 European Cup	(England) The Willows, Salford	8,494
95	16 March 1975	England	20–2	France	1975 World Cup	(England) Headingley, Leeds	10,842
96	10 June 1975	England	7–12	Wales	1975 World Cup	(Australia) Lang Park, Brisbane	6,000
97	21 June 1975	New Zealand	17–17	England	1975 World Cup	(New Zealand) Carlaw Park, Auckland	12,000
98	28 June 1975	Australia	10–10	England	1975 World Cup	(Australia) Sydney Cricket Ground, Sydney	33,858
99	6 July 1975	Papua New Guinea	12–40	England	Friendly	(Papua New Guinea) Lloyd Robson Oval, Port Moresby	12,000
100	20 September 1975	England	22–16	Wales	1975 World Cup	(England) Wilderspool Stadium, Warrington	5,034
101	11 October 1975	France	2–48	England	1975 World Cup	(France) Stade Chaban–Delmas, Bordeaux	1,581
102	25 October 1975	England	27–12	New Zealand	1975 World Cup	(England) Odsal Stadium, Bradford	5,937
103	1 November 1975	England	16–13	Australia	1975 World Cup	(England) Central Park, Wigan	9,393
104	12 November 1975	England	0–25	Australia	1975 World Cup	(England) Headingley, Leeds	7,727
105	29 January 1977	England	2–6	Wales	1977 European Cup	(England) Headingley, Leeds	6,472
106	20 March 1977	France	28–15	England	1977 European Cup	(France) Stade Albert Domec, Carcassonne	12,000
107	5 March 1978	France	11–13	England	1978 European Cup	(France) Stade Municipal, Toulouse	6,000
108	28 May 1978	England	60–13	Wales	1978 European Cup	(England) Knowsley Road, St. Helens	10,000
109	16 March 1979	England	15–7	Wales	1979 European Cup	(England) Naughton Park, Widnes	5,099
110	24 March 1979	England	12–6	France	1979 European Cup	(England) Wilderspool Stadium, Warrington	5,004

== 1980s ==
	Date	Home	Score	Away	Competition	Venue	Attendance
111	29 February 1980	England	26–9	Wales	1980 European Cup	(England) Craven Park, Hull	7,557
112	16 March 1980	France	2–4	England	1980 European Cup	(France) Parc des Sports Et de l'Amitie, Narbonne	20,000
113	21 February 1981	England	1–5	France	1981 European Cup	(England) Headingley, Leeds	3,229
114	18 March 1981	England	17–4	Wales	1981 European Cup	(England) Craven Park, Hull	4,786
115	8 November 1981	Wales	15–20	England	Friendly	(Wales) Ninian Park, Cardiff	13,173
116	14 October 1984	Wales	9–28	England	Friendly	(Wales) Bridgend Field, Ebbw Vale	2,111

== 1990s ==
	Date	Home	Score	Away	Competition	Venue	Attendance
117	27 November 1992	Wales	11–36	England	Test Match	(Wales) Vetch Field, Swansea	10,243
118	1 February 1995	Wales	18–16	England	1995 European Cup	(Wales) Ninian Park, Cardiff	6,000
119	15 February 1995	England	19–16	France	1995 European Cup	(England) Thunderdome, Gateshead	6,252
120	7 October 1995	England	20–16	Australia	1995 World Cup	(England) Wembley Stadium, London	41,271
121	11 October 1995	England	46–0	Fiji	1995 World Cup	(England) Central Park, Wigan	26,263
122	14 October 1995	England	46–0	South Africa	1995 World Cup	(England) Headingley, Leeds	14,014
123	21 October 1995	England	25–10	Wales	1995 World Cup	(England) Old Trafford, Manchester	30,042
124	28 October 1995	England	8–16	Australia	1995 World Cup	(England) Wembley Stadium, London	66,540
125	12 June 1996	England	73–6	France	1996 European Cup	(England) Thunderdome, Gateshead	6,239
126	26 June 1996	Wales	12–26	England	1996 European Cup	(Wales) Cardiff Arms Park, Cardiff	5,425
127	19 June 1998	England	15–12	Wales	Friendly	(England) Naughton Park, Widnes	5,154
128	13 October 1999	France	20–28	England	Test Match	(France) Stade Albert Domec, Carcassonne	3,000
129	23 October 1999	England	50–20	France	Test Match	(England) The Boulevard, Hull	3,068

== 2000s ==
	Date	Home	Score	Away	Competition	Venue	Attendance
130	October 2000	United States	0–110	England	Friendly	(United States) Orlando	?
131	28 October 2000	England	2–22	Australia	2000 World Cup	(England) Twickenham Stadium, London	33,758
132	1 November 2000	England	76–4	Russia	2000 World Cup	(England) Knowsley Road, St. Helens	5,736
133	4 November 2000	England	66–10	Fiji	2000 World Cup	(England) Headingley, Leeds	10,052
134	11 November 2000	England	26–16	Ireland	2000 World Cup	(England) Headingley, Leeds	15,405
135	18 November 2000	England	6–49	New Zealand	2000 World Cup	(England) Reebok Stadium, Bolton	16,032
136	29 July 2001	Wales	33–42	England	Friendly	(Wales) Racecourse Ground, Wrexham	6,373
137	2 November 2003	England	102–0	Russia	2003 European Cup	(England) Odsal Stadium, Bradford	1,376
138	9 November 2003	England	22–4	Wales	2003 European Cup	(England) Headingley, Leeds	2,124
139	16 November 2003	England	68–6	France	2003 European Cup	(England) Wilderspool Stadium, Warrington	2,536
140	24 October 2004	Russia	4–98	England	2004 European Cup	(Russia) Luzhniki Stadium, Moscow	1,000
141	30 October 2004	France	4–42	England	2004 European Cup	(France) Parc des Sports, Avignon	4,000
142	7 November 2004	England	36–12	Ireland	2004 European Cup	(England) Halliwell Jones Stadium, Warrington	3,582
143	23 October 2005	England	22–12	France	Friendly	(England) Headingley, Leeds	2,609
144	6 November 2005	England	22–30	New Zealand	Friendly	(England) Halliwell Jones Stadium, Warrington	7,298
145	22 October 2006	England	26–10	France	Federation Shield	(England) Headingley, Leeds	5,547
146	29 October 2006	England	40–18	Tonga	Federation Shield	(England) Twickenham Stoop, London	2,388
147	5 November 2006	England	38–14	Samoa	Federation Shield	(England) KC Stadium, Hull	5,698
148	12 November 2006	England	32–14	Tonga	Federation Shield	(England) Halton Stadium, Widnes	3,000
149	27 June 2008	France	8–56	England	Test Match	(France) Stade Ernest–Wallon, Toulouse	8,326
150	10 October 2008	England	74–0	Wales	Friendly	(England) Keepmoat Stadium, Doncaster	11,263
151	25 October 2008	England	32–22	Papua New Guinea	2008 World Cup	(Australia) Willows Sports Complex, Townsville	10,780
152	2 November 2008	Australia	52–4	England	2008 World Cup	(Australia) Docklands Stadium, Melbourne	36,297
153	8 November 2008	England	24–36	New Zealand	2008 World Cup	(Australia) Newcastle International Sports Centre, Newcastle	15,145
154	15 November 2008	England	22–32	New Zealand	2008 World Cup	(Australia) Lang Park, Brisbane	26,659
155	13 June 2009	France	12–66	England	Test Match	(France) Stade Jean–Bouin, Paris	7,600
156	17 October 2009	Wales	12–48	England	Friendly	(Wales) Brewery Field, Bridgend	3,249
157	23 October 2009	England	34–12	France	2009 Four Nations	(England) Keepmoat Stadium, Doncaster	11,529
158	31 October 2009	England	16–26	Australia	2009 Four Nations	(England) JJB Stadium, Wigan	23,122
159	7 November 2009	England	20–12	New Zealand	2009 Four Nations	(England) Kirklees Stadium, Huddersfield	19,390
160	14 November 2009	England	16–46	Australia	2009 Four Nations	(England) Elland Road, Leeds	31,042

== 2010s ==
	Date	Home	Score	Away	Competition	Location	Attendance
161	12 June 2010	England	60–6	France	Friendly	(England) Leigh Sports Village, Leigh	7,951
162	4 October 2010	Cumbria	18–18	England	Friendly	(England) Recreation Ground, Whitehaven	5,250
163	16 October 2010	Aotearoa Māori	18–18	England	Friendly	(New Zealand) Mount Smart Stadium, Auckland	11,512
164	23 October 2010	New Zealand	24–10	England	2010 Four Nations	(New Zealand) Wellington Regional Stadium, Wellington	20,681
165	31 October 2010	Australia	34–14	England	2010 Four Nations	(Australia) Melbourne Rectangular Stadium, Melbourne	18,894
166	6 November 2010	England	36–10	Papua New Guinea	2010 Four Nations	(New Zealand) Eden Park, Auckland	44,324
167	10 June 2011	England	12–16	Exiles	2011 International Origin	(England) Headingley, Leeds	14,174
168	21 October 2011	France	18–32	England	Friendly	(France) Parc des Sports, Avignon	16,866
169	29 October 2011	England	42–4	Wales	2011 Four Nations	(England) Leigh Sports Village, Leigh	10,377
170	5 November 2011	England	20–36	Australia	2011 Four Nations	(England) Wembley Stadium, London	42,344
171	12 November 2011	England	28–6	New Zealand	2011 Four Nations	(England) KC Stadium, Hull	23,447
172	19 November 2011	England	8–30	Australia	2011 Four Nations	(England) Elland Road, Leeds	34,174
173	16 June 2012	England	18–10	Exiles	2012 International Origin	(England) Langtree Park, St. Helens	11,083
174	4 July 2012	England	20–32	Exiles	2012 International Origin	(England) Kirklees Stadium, Huddersfield	7,865
175	27 October 2012	Wales	12–80	England	2012 Autumn International Series	(Wales) Racecourse Ground, Wrexham	4,014
176	3 November 2012	England	44–6	France	2012 Autumn International Series	(England) Craven Park, Hull	7,173
177	11 November 2012	England	48–4	France	2012 Autumn International Series	(England) Salford City Stadium, Salford	7,921
178	14 June 2013	England	30–10	Exiles	2013 International Origin	(England) Halliwell Jones Stadium, Warrington	7,926
179	19 October 2013	England	14–15	Italy	Friendly	(England) Salford City Stadium, Salford	4,382
180	26 October 2013	England	20–28	Australia	2013 World Cup	(Wales) Millennium Stadium, Cardiff	45,052
181	2 November 2013	England	42–0	Ireland	2013 World Cup	(England) Kirklees Stadium, Huddersfield	24,375
182	9 November 2013	England	34–12	Fiji	2013 World Cup	(England) KC Stadium, Hull	25,114
183	16 November 2013	England	34–6	France	2013 World Cup	(England) DW Stadium, Wigan	22,276
184	23 November 2013	England	18–20	New Zealand	2013 World Cup	(England) Wembley Stadium, London	67,545
185	25 October 2014	England	32–26	Samoa	2014 Four Nations	(Australia) Lang Park, Brisbane	47,813
186	2 November 2014	Australia	16–12	England	2014 Four Nations	(Australia) AAMI Park, Melbourne	20,585
187	8 November 2014	New Zealand	16–14	England	2014 Four Nations	(New Zealand) Otago Stadium, Dunedin	15,863
188	24 October 2015	England	84–4	France	Test Match	(England) Leigh Sports Village, Leigh	8,380
189	1 November 2015	England	26–12	New Zealand	2015 Baskerville Shield	(England) KC Stadium, Hull	23,526
190	7 November 2015	England	2–9	New Zealand	2015 Baskerville Shield	(England) Olympic Stadium, London	44,393
191	14 November 2015	England	20–14	New Zealand	2015 Baskerville Shield	(England) DW Stadium, Wigan	24,741
192	22 October 2016	France	6–40	England	Test Match	(France) Parc des Sports, Avignon	14,276
193	29 October 2016	England	16–17	New Zealand	2016 Four Nations	(England) Kirklees Stadium, Huddersfield	24,070
194	5 November 2016	England	38–12	Scotland	2016 Four Nations	(England) Ricoh Arena, Coventry	21,009
195	13 November 2016	England	18–36	Australia	2016 Four Nations	(England) Olympic Stadium, London	35,569
196	6 May 2017	Samoa	10–30	England	Test Match	(Australia) Campbelltown Stadium, Campbelltown	18,271
197	20 October 2017	(Australia) Combined Affiliated States	12–74	England	Friendly	(Australia) Perth Oval, Perth	
198	27 October 2017	Australia	18–4	England	2017 World Cup	(Australia) Melbourne Rectangular Stadium, Melbourne	22,724
199	4 November 2017	England	29–10	Lebanon	2017 World Cup	(Australia) Sydney Football Stadium, Sydney	10,237
200	12 November 2017	England	36–6	France	2017 World Cup	(Australia) Perth Rectangular Stadium, Perth	14,744
201	19 November 2017	England	36–6	Papua New Guinea	2017 World Cup	(Australia) Melbourne Rectangular Stadium, Melbourne	10,563
201	25 November 2017	Tonga	18–20	England	2017 World Cup	(New Zealand) Mount Smart Stadium, Auckland	30,003
203	2 December 2017	Australia	6–0	England	2017 World Cup	(Australia) Brisbane Stadium, Brisbane	40,033
204	23 June 2018	New Zealand	18–36	England	Test Match	(United States) Mile High Stadium, Denver	19,320
205	17 October 2018	England	44–6	France	Test Match	(England) Leigh Sports Village, Leigh	5,144
206	27 October 2018	England	18–16	New Zealand	2018 Baskerville Shield	(England) KCOM Stadium, Hull	17,649
207	3 November 2018	England	20–14	New Zealand	2018 Baskerville Shield	(England) Anfield, Liverpool	26,234
208	11 November 2018	England	0–34	New Zealand	2018 Baskerville Shield	(England) Elland Road, Leeds	32,186

2019 Great Britain tour (Note: In 2019 the idea of restoring the Great Britain team was trial with a tour of New Zealand and Papua New Guinea. The Great Britain squad was all but one English. The tour was considered a failure and the idea of restoring Great Britain was shelved.)

Date	Home	Score	Away	Competition	Location	Attendance
26 October 2019	Tonga	14–6	Great Britain	2019 Lions tour of New Zealand and Papua New Guinea	(New Zealand) Waikato Stadium, Hamilton	9,420
2 November 2019	New Zealand	12–8	Great Britain	2019 Lions tour of New Zealand and Papua New Guinea	(New Zealand) Eden Park, Auckland	25,257
9 November 2019	New Zealand	23–8	Great Britain	2019 Lions tour of New Zealand and Papua New Guinea	(New Zealand) Rugby League Park, Christchurch	8,875
16 November 2019	Papua New Guinea	28–10	Great Britain	2019 Lions tour of New Zealand and Papua New Guinea	(Papua New Guinea) PNG Football Stadium, Port Moresby	Unknown

== 2020s ==
	Date	Home	Score	Away	Competition	Location	Attendance
209	25 June 2021	England	24–26	Combined Nations All Stars	Friendly	(England) Halliwell Jones Stadium, Warrington	4,000
211	23 October 2021	France	10–30	England	Test Match	(France) Stade Gilbert Brutus, Perpignan	6,000
212	18 June 2022	England	18–4	Combined Nations All Stars	Friendly	(England) Halliwell Jones Stadium, Warrington	9,393
213	7 October 2022	England	50–0	Fiji	Friendly	(England) AJ Bell Stadium, Salford	6,849
214	15 October 2022	England	60–6	Samoa	2021 World Cup	(England) St James' Park, Newcastle	43,199
215	22 October 2022	England	42–18	France	2021 World Cup	(England) University of Bolton Stadium, Bolton	23,648
216	29 October 2022	England	94–4	Greece	2021 World Cup	(England) Bramall Lane, Sheffield	18,760
217	5 November 2022	England	46–6	Papua New Guinea	2021 World Cup	(England) DW Stadium, Wigan	23,170
218	12 November 2022	England	26–27; GP	Samoa	2021 World Cup	(England) Emirates Stadium, London	40,489
219	29 April 2023	England	64–0	France	Test Match	(England) Halliwell Jones Stadium, Warrington	8,422
220	22 October 2023	England	22–18	Tonga	2023 Test Series	(England) Totally Wicked Stadium, St Helens	12,898
221	28 October 2023	England	14–4	Tonga	2023 Test Series	(England) Kirklees Stadium, Huddersfield	11,120
222	4 November 2023	England	26–4	Tonga	2023 Test Series	(England) Headingley Stadium, Leeds	15,477
223	29 June 2024	France	8–40	England	Test Match	(France) Stade Ernest-Wallon, Toulouse	4,907
224	27 October 2024	England	34–18	Samoa	2024 Test Series	(England) Brick Community Stadium, Wigan	15,137
225	2 November 2024	England	34–16	Samoa	2024 Test Series	(England) Headingley Stadium, Leeds	16,068
226	25 October 2025	England	6–26	Australia	2025 Ashes	(England) Wembley Stadium, London	60,812
227	1 November 2025	England	4–14	Australia	2025 Ashes	(England) Hill Dickinson Stadium, Liverpool	52,106
228	8 November 2025	England	8–30	Australia	2025 Ashes	(England) Headingley Stadium, Leeds	19,500
229	17 October 2026	England	12–30	Tonga	2026 World Cup	(Australia) Perth Rectangular Stadium, Perth	18,302
230	24 October 2026	England	82–0	France	2026 World Cup	(Australia) Perth Rectangular Stadium, Perth	10,723
231	30 October 2026	England	34–12	Papua New Guinea	2026 World Cup	(Australia) Wollongong Showground, Wollongong	15,063
	2027	England	–	New Zealand	2027 Baskerville Shield		
	2027	England	–	New Zealand	2027 Baskerville Shield		
	2027	England	–	New Zealand	2027 Baskerville Shield		
	2028	Australia	–	England	2028 Ashes		
	2028	Australia	–	England	2028 Ashes		
	2028	Australia	–	England	2028 Ashes		
