= List of Wales national rugby league team results =

The following is a list of Wales national rugby team results since 1908

== Overall ==
Below is table of the representative rugby matches played by the Wales national XIII at test level up until 22 October 2024.

Opponent	Matches	Won	Drawn	Lost	Win %	For	Aga	Diff
Australia	13	0	0	13	0%	143	455	–312
Cook Islands	3	1	0	2	33.33%	74	52	+22
England	68	16	2	50	23.53%	801	1,510	–709
England Knights	2	1	0	1	50%	19	34	–15
Fiji	1	0	0	1	0%	6	72	–66
France	44	18	0	26	40.91%	653	747	–94
Ireland	10	6	0	4	60%	253	199	+54
Italy	3	1	0	2	33.33%	42	59	–17
Jamaica	2	1	1	0	50%	38	32	+6
Lebanon	3	1	0	2	33.33%	72	110	–38
New Zealand	10	3	0	7	30%	158	264	–106
(Māori people) New Zealand Maori	1	1	0	0	100%	18	12	+6
Other Nationalities	5	1	0	4	20%	60	101	–41
Papua New Guinea	5	3	0	2	60%	146	104	+42
Russia	1	1	0	0	100%	74	4	+70
Samoa	1	1	0	0	100%	22	10	+12
Scotland	10	6	0	4	60%	266	221	+45
Serbia	3	3	0	0	100%	176	8	+168
South Africa	1	1	0	0	100%	40	12	+28
Tonga	1	0	0	1	0%	6	32	-26
United States	3	2	0	1	66.67%	174	38	+136
Total	190	67	3	120	35.26%	3,241	4,076	–835

== 1900s ==
Date	Home	Score	Away	Competition	Location	Attendance
1 January 1908	Wales	9–8	New Zealand	1907–08 Kiwis Tour	Athletic Ground, Aberdare	20,000
20 April 1908	Wales	35–18	England	Friendly	Athletic Ground, Tonypandy	12,000
28 December 1908	England	31–7	Wales	Friendly	Wheater's Field, Broughton	4,000
4 December 1909	England	19–13	Wales	Friendly	Belle Vue, Wakefield	4,000

== 1910s ==
Date	Home	Score	Away	Competition	Location	Attendance
9 April 1910	Wales	39–18	England	Friendly	Bridgend Field, Ebbw Vale	4,000
10 December 1910	England	39–13	Wales	Friendly	Butts Park Arena, Coventry	5,000
1 April 1911	Wales	8–27	England	Friendly	Bridgend Field, Ebbw Vale	4,000
7 October 1911	Wales	20–28	Australia	1911–12 Kangaroo Tour	Bridgend Field, Ebbw Vale	7,000
20 January 1912	England	31–5	Wales	Friendly	The Watersheddings, Oldham	8,000
15 February 1913	England	40–16	Wales	Friendly	Home Park, Plymouth	8,000
14 February 1914	England	16–12	Wales	Friendly	Knowsley Road, St. Helens	10,000

== 1920s ==
Date	Home	Score	Away	Competition	Location	Attendance
19 January 1921	England	35–9	Wales	Friendly	Elland Road, Leeds	13,000
10 December 1921	Wales	16–21	Australia	1921–22 Kangaroo Tour	Taff Vale Park, Pontypridd	13,000
11 December 1922	England	12–7	Wales	Friendly	Herne Hill Velodrome, London	3,000
7 February 1923	England	2–13	Wales	Friendly	Central Park, Wigan	12,000
1 November 1923	England	18–11	Wales	Friendly	Fartown Ground, Huddersfield	11,066
7 February 1925	England	27–22	Wales	Friendly	Lonsdale Park, Workington	14,000
30 September 1925	England	18–14	Wales	Friendly	Central Park, Wigan	12,000
12 April 1926	Wales	22–30	England	Friendly	Taff Vale Park, Pontypridd	23,000
4 December 1926	Wales	34–8	New Zealand	1926–27 Kiwis Tour	Taff Vale Park, Pontypridd	13,000
6 April 1927	England	11–8	Wales	Friendly	Wheater's Field, Broughton	6,000
11 January 1928	England	20–12	Wales	Friendly	Central Park, Wigan	12,000
14 November 1928	Wales	15–39	England	Friendly	Sloper Road Greyhound Stadium, Cardiff	15,000

== 1930s ==
Date	Home	Score	Away	Competition	Location	Attendance
18 January 1930	Wales	10–26	Australia	1929–30 Kangaroo Tour	Wembley Stadium, London	20,000
18 March 1931	England	23–18	Wales	Friendly	Fartown Ground, Huddersfield	6,000
27 January 1932	England	19–2	Wales	Friendly	The Willows, Salford, Salford	8,000
30 November 1932	England	14–13	Wales	Friendly	Elland Road, Leeds	4,000
30 December 1933	Wales	19–51	Australia	1933–34 Kangaroo Tour	Wembley Stadium, London	10,000
1 January 1935	France	18–11	Wales	1935 European Championship	Stade Chaban–Delmas, Bordeaux	15,000
10 April 1935	England	24–11	Wales	1935 European Championship	Anfield, Liverpool	7,100
23 November 1935	Wales	41–7	France	1935–36 European Championship	Stebonheath Park, Llanelli	25,000
1 February 1936	England	14–17	Wales	1935–36 European Championship	Craven Park, Hull	17,000
7 November 1936	Wales	3–2	England	1936–37 European Championship	Taff Vale Park, Pontypridd	12,000
6 December 1936	France	3–9	Wales	1936–37 European Championship	Stade de Paris, Paris	17,000
29 January 1938	England	6–7	Wales	1938 European Championship	Odsal Stadium, Bradford	8,637
2 April 1938	Wales	18–2	France	1938 European Championship	Stebonheath Park, Llanelli	20,000
5 November 1938	Wales	17–9	England	1938–39 European Championship	Stebonheath Park, Llanelli	17,000
16 April 1939	France	16–10	Wales	1938–39 European Championship	Stade Chaban–Delmas, Bordeaux	25,000
23 December 1939	England	3–16	Wales	Friendly	Odsal Stadium, Bradford	15,257

== 1940s ==
Date	Home	Score	Away	Competition	Location	Attendance
16 April 1940	England	5–8	Wales	Friendly	Watersheddings, Oldham	5,000
18 October 1941	England	9–9	Wales	Friendly	Odsal Stadium, Bradford	4,339
27 February 1943	England	15–9	Wales	Friendly	Central Park, Wigan	17,000
26 February 1944	England	9–9	Wales	Friendly	Central Park, Wigan	16,028
10 March 1945	England	18–8	Wales	Friendly	Central Park, Wigan	24,000
24 November 1945	Wales	11–3	England	1945–46 European Championship	St Helens Rugby Ground, Swansea	30,000
24 March 1946	France	19–7	Wales	1945–46 European Championship	Stade Chaban–Delmas, Bordeaux	18,000
12 October 1946	England	10–13	Wales	1946–47 European Championship	Station Road, Swinton	20,213
16 November 1946	Wales	5–19	England	1946–47 European Championship	St Helens Rugby Ground, Swansea	25,000
18 January 1947	France	14–5	Wales	1946–47 European Championship	Stade Velodrome, Marseille	25,000
12 April 1947	Wales	17–15	France	1946–47 European Championship	St Helens Rugby Ground, Swansea	20,000
20 September 1947	England	8–10	Wales	1947–48 European Championship	Central Park, Wigan	27,000
18 October 1947	Wales	28–20	New Zealand	1947–48 Kiwi Tour	St Helens Rugby Ground, Swansea	18,283
23 November 1947	France	29–21	Wales	1947–48 European Rugby League Championship	Stade Chaban–Delmas, Bordeaux	26,000
6 December 1947	Wales	7–18	England	1947–48 European Rugby League Championship	St Helens Rugby Ground, Swansea	10,000
20 March 1948	Wales	12–20	France	1947–48 European Rugby League Championship	St Helens Rugby Ground, Swansea	12,032
22 September 1948	England	11–5	Wales	1948–49 European Championship	Central Park, Wigan	12,638
23 October 1948	Wales	9–12	France	1948–49 European Championship	St Helens Rugby Ground, Swansea	12,032
20 November 1948	Wales	5–12	Australia	1948 Kangaroo Tour	St Helens Rugby Ground, Swansea	9,224
5 February 1949	Wales	14–10	England	1948–49 European Championship	St Helens Rugby Ground, Swansea	9,553
10 April 1949	France	11–0	Wales	1948–49 European Championship	Stade Velodrome, Marseille	30,000
22 October 1949	Wales	5–6	Other Nationalities	1949–50 European Championship	The Park, Abertillery	2,000
12 November 1949	Wales	16–8	France	1949–50 European Championship	St Helens Rugby Ground, Swansea	4,749

== 1950s ==
Date	Home	Score	Away	Competition	Location	Attendance
1 March 1950	England	11–6	Wales	1949–50 European Rugby League Championship	Central Park, Wigan	28,000
2 September 1950	Wales	29–11	Italy	Friendly	Brewery Field, Bridgend	2,500
14 October 1950	Wales	4–22	England	1950–51 European Championship	The Park, Abertillery	8,000
31 March 1951	Wales	21–27	Other Nationalities	1950–51 European Championship	St Helens Rugby Ground, Swansea	5,000
15 April 1951	France	28–13	Wales	1950–51 European Championship	Stade Velodrome, Marseille	18,000
19 September 1951	England	35–11	Wales	1951–52 European Championship	Knowsley Road, St. Helens	20,918
1 December 1951	Wales	11–22	Other Nationalities	1951–52 European Championship	The Park, Abertillery	3,386
7 December 1951	Wales	3–15	New Zealand	1951–52 Kiwi Tour	Odsal Stadium, Bradford	8,568
6 April 1952	France	20–12	Wales	1951–52 European Championship	Stade Chaban–Delmas, Bordeaux	15,678
17 November 1952	England	19–8	Wales	1952–53 European Championship	Central Park, Wigan	13,503
25 October 1952	Wales	22–16	France	1952–53 European Championship	Headingley, Leeds	10,380
15 April 1953	Wales	18–16	Other Nationalities	1952–53 European Championship	Wilderspool Stadium, Warrington	8,449
16 September 1953	England	24–5	Wales	1953–54 European Championship	Knowsley Road, St. Helens	19,357
7 October 1953	Wales	5–30	Other Nationalities	1953–54 European Championship	Odsal Stadium, Bradford	14,646
13 December 1953	France	23–22	Wales	1953–54 European Championship	Stade Velodrome, Marseille	25,000
1 March 1959	France	25–8	Wales	Friendly	Stadium Municipal, Toulouse	25,000

== 1960s ==
Date	Home	Score	Away	Competition	Location	Attendance
17 February 1963	France	23–2	Wales	Friendly	Stade Municipal, Toulouse	6,150
7 November 1968	England	17–24	Wales	Friendly	The Willows, Salford, Salford	6,002
9 March 1969	France	17–13	Wales	Friendly	Stade de Paris, Paris	6,189
18 October 1969	England	40–23	Wales	1969–70 European Championship	Headingley, Leeds	8,355
23 October 1969	Wales	2–8	France	1969–70 European Championship	The Willows, Salford, Salford	6,189

== 1970s ==
Date	Home	Score	Away	Competition	Location	Attendance
25 January 1970	France	11–15	Wales	1969–70 European Championship	Stade Gilbert Brutus, Perpignan	11,000
24 February 1970	England	26–7	Wales	1969–70 European Championship	Headingley, Leeds	9,393
16 February 1975	Wales	21–8	France	1975 European Championship	St Helens Rugby Ground, Swansea	20,000
25 February 1975	England	12–8	Wales	1975 European Championship	The Willows, Salford, Salford	8,494
2 March 1975	France	14–7	Wales	1975 World Cup	Stade Municipal, Toulouse	7,563
10 June 1975	Wales	12–7	England	1975 World Cup	Lang Park, Brisbane	6,000
14 June 1975	Australia	30–13	Wales	1975 World Cup	Sydney Cricket Ground, Sydney	25,386
28 June 1975	New Zealand	13–8	Wales	1975 World Cup	Carlaw Park, Auckland	9,368
20 September 1975	England	22–16	Wales	1975 World Cup	Wilderspool Stadium, Warrington	5,034
19 October 1975	Wales	6–18	Australia	1975 World Cup	St Helens Rugby Ground, Swansea	11,112
2 November 1975	Wales	25–24	New Zealand	1975 World Cup	St Helens Rugby Ground, Swansea	2,645
6 November 1975	Wales	23–2	France	1975 World Cup	The Willows, Salford, Salford	2,247
29 January 1977	England	2–6	Wales	1977 European Championship	Headingley, Leeds	6,472
20 February 1977	France	13–2	Wales	1977 European Championship	Stadium Municipal, Toulouse	5,827
15 January 1978	Wales	29–7	France	1978 European Championship	Naughton Park, Widnes	9,502
28 May 1978	England	60–13	Wales	1978 European Championship	Knowsley Road, St. Helens	9,759
15 October 1978	Wales	3–8	Australia	1978 Kangaroo tour	St Helens Rugby Ground, Swansea	4,250
4 February 1979	France	15–8	Wales	1979 European Championship	Parc des Sports Et de l'Amitie, Narbonne	13,728
16 March 1979	England	15–7	Wales	1979 European Championship	Naughton Park, Widnes	5,099

== 1980s ==
Date	Home	Score	Away	Competition	Location	Attendance
26 January 1980	Wales	7–21	France	1980 European Championship	Naughton Park, Widnes	2,804
29 February 1980	England	26–9	Wales	1980 European Championship	Boothferry Park, Hull	7,557
31 January 1981	France	23–5	Wales	1981 European Championship	Parc des Sports Et de l'Amitie, Narbonne	4,120
18 March 1981	England	17–4	Wales	1981 European Championship	Craven Park, Hull	4,786
8 November 1981	Wales	15–20	England	Friendly	Ninian Park, Cardiff	13,173
24 October 1982	Wales	7–37	Australia	1982 Kangaroo Tour	Ninian Park, Cardiff	5,617
14 October 1984	Wales	9–28	England	Friendly	Bridgend Field, Ebbw Vale	2,111

== 1990s ==
Date	Home	Score	Away	Competition	Location	Attendance
27 October 1991	Wales	68–0	Papua New Guinea	1991 Kumuls tour	Vetch Field, Swansea	11,422
22 March 1992	Wales	35–6	France	Test Match	Vetch Field, Swansea	10,133
27 November 1992	Wales	11–36	England	Test Match	Vetch Field, Swansea	10,243
13 December 1992	France	18–19	Wales	Test Match	Stade Gilbert Brutus, Perpignan	3,700
3 October 1993	Wales	19–24	New Zealand	1993 Kiwi Tour	Vetch Field, Swansea	6,073
4 March 1994	Wales	13–12	France	Test Match	Ninian Park, Cardiff	6,287
30 October 1994	Wales	4–46	Australia	1994 Kangaroo Tour	Ninian Park, Cardiff	8,729
1 February 1995	Wales	18–16	England	1995 European Championship	Ninian Park, Cardiff	6,252
4 March 1995	France	10–22	Wales	1995 European Championship	Stade Albert Domec, Carcassonne	5,000
11 June 1995	United States	10–66	Wales	Friendly	Ursinus College, Philadelphia	2,000
18 June 1995	United States	4–92	Wales	Friendly	Ursinus College, Philadelphia	2,500
9 October 1995	Wales	28–6	France	1995 World Cup	Ninian Park, Cardiff	10,250
15 October 1995	Wales	22–10	Western Samoa	1995 World Cup	Vetch Field, Swansea	15,385
21 October 1995	England	25–10	Wales	1995 World Cup	Old Trafford, Manchester	30,042
5 June 1996	France	14–34	Wales	1996 European Championship	Stade Albert Domec, Carcassonne	4,300
26 June 1996	Wales	12–26	England	1996 European Championship	Cardiff Arms Park, Cardiff	5,425
19 June 1998	England	15–12	Wales	Test Match	Naughton Park, Widnes	5,154
15 October 1999	Wales	17–24	Ireland	1999 Triangular Series	Vetch Field, Swansea	812
22 October 1999	Scotland	36–16	Wales	1999 Triangular Series	Firhill Stadium, Glasgow	667

== 2000s ==
Date	Home	Score	Away	Competition	Location	Attendance
19 October 2000	South Africa	12–40	Wales	Friendly	(South Africa) Loftus Versfeld Stadium, Pretoria	6,000
29 October 2000	Wales	38–6	Cook Islands	2000 World Cup	(Wales) Racecourse Ground, Wrexham	5,016
2 November 2000	Wales	24–22	Lebanon	2000 World Cup	(Wales) Stradey Park, Llanelli	1,497
5 November 2000	Wales	18–58	New Zealand	2000 World Cup	(Wales) Millennium Stadium, Cardiff	17,612
12 November 2000	Wales	22–8	Papua New Guinea	2000 World Cup	(England) Halton Stadium, Widnes	5,211
19 November 2000	Australia	46–22	Wales	2000 World Cup	(England) Kirklees Stadium, Huddersfield	8,114
29 July 2001	Wales	33–42	England	Friendly	(Wales) Racecourse Ground, Wrexham	6,373
3 November 2002	Wales	22–50	New Zealand	2002 Kiwi Tour	(Wales) Millennium Stadium, Cardiff	8,746
26 October 2003	Wales	74–4	Russia	2003 European Cup	(Wales) Talbot Athletic Ground, Port Talbot	1,082
2 November 2003	Wales	4–76	Australia	2003 Kangaroo Tour	(Wales) Brewery Field, Bridgend	3,112
9 November 2003	England	22–4	Wales	2003 European Cup	(England) Headingley, Leeds	2,124
17 October 2004	Wales	12–25	Ireland	2004 European Cup	(Wales) Talbot Athletic Ground, Port Talbot	1,296
24 October 2004	Scotland	30–22	Wales	2004 European Cup	(Scotland) Old Anniesland, Glasgow	1,047
16 October 2005	Wales	22–14	Scotland	2005 European Cup	(Wales) Brewery Field, Bridgend	1,176
29 October 2005	Ireland	10–31	Wales	2005 European Cup	(Republic of Ireland) Terenure College RFC, Dublin	500
5 November 2005	France	38–16	Wales	2005 European Cup	(France) Stade Albert Domec, Carcassonne	3,000
29 October 2006	Wales	14–21	Scotland	2008 World Cup qualifying	(Wales) Brewery Field, Bridgend	2,378
28 October 2007	Wales	50–10	Papua New Guinea	2007 Kumuls Tour	(Wales) Brewery Field, Bridgend	1,456
4 November 2007	Scotland	16–18	Wales	2008 World Cup qualifying	(Scotland) Old Anniesland, Glasgow	911
9 November 2007	Wales	26–50	Lebanon	2008 World Cup qualifying	(England) Halton Stadium, Widnes	753
10 October 2008	England	74–0	Wales	Friendly	(England) Keepmoat Stadium, Doncaster	11,263
17 October 2009	Wales	12–48	England	Friendly	(Wales) Brewery Field, Bridgend	3,249
24 October 2009	Serbia	8–88	Wales	2009 European Cup	(Serbia) Smederevo City Stadium, Smederevo	437
1 November 2009	Wales	42–12	Ireland	2009 European Cup	(Wales) Sardis Road, Pontypridd	2,143
8 November 2009	Wales	28–16	Scotland	2009 European Cup	(Wales) Brewery Field, Bridgend	1,608

== 2010s ==
Date	Home	Score	Away	Competition	Location	Attendance
6 October 2010	Wales	6–13	Italy	Friendly	(Wales) Racecourse Ground, Wrexham	2,971
10 October 2010	Scotland	22–60	Wales	2010 European Cup	(Scotland) Old Anniesland, Glasgow	787
17 October 2010	Wales	31–30	Ireland	2010 European Cup	(Wales) The Gnoll, Neath	2,165
23 October 2010	France	11–12	Wales	2010 European Cup	(France) Stade Municipal d'Albi, Albi	10,413
22 October 2011	Wales	30–6	Ireland	Friendly	(Wales) The Gnoll, Neath	2,265
29 October 2011	England	42–4	Wales	2011 Four Nations	(England) Leigh Sports Village, Leigh	10,377
5 November 2011	Wales	0–36	New Zealand	2011 Four Nations	(England) Wembley Stadium, London	42,344
13 November 2011	Wales	14–56	Australia	2011 Four Nations	(Wales) Racecourse Ground, Wrexham	5,233
16 June 2012	Wales	16–28	France	Friendly	(Wales) Racecourse Ground, Wrexham	1,464
20 October 2012	France	20–6	Wales	2012 Autumn International Series	(France) Stade Felix Bollaert, Lens	11,278
27 October 2012	Wales	12–80	England	2012 Autumn International Series	(Wales) Racecourse Ground, Wrexham	4,014
26 October 2013	Wales	16–32	Italy	2013 World Cup	(Wales) Millennium Stadium, Cardiff	45,052
3 November 2013	Wales	16–24	United States	2013 World Cup	(Wales) Racecourse Ground, Wrexham	8,019
10 November 2013	Wales	24–28	Cook Islands	2013 World Cup	(Wales) The Gnoll, Neath	3,270
17 October 2014	Scotland	42–18	Wales	2014 European Cup	(England) Derwent Park, Workington	2,036
25 October 2014	France	42–22	Wales	2014 European Cup	(France) Stade Municipal d'Albi, Albi	5,225
2 November 2014	Wales	14–46	Ireland	2014 European Cup	(Wales) Racecourse Ground, Wrexham	1,293
16 October 2015	Wales	18–12	Scotland	2015 European Cup	(Wales) Racecourse Ground, Wrexham	1,253
30 October 2015	Wales	14–6	France	2015 European Cup	(Wales) Cardiff Arms Park, Cardiff	1,028
7 November 2015	Ireland	4–30	Wales	2015 European Cup	(Republic of Ireland) Carlisle Grounds, Bray	1,405
15 October 2016	Wales	50–0	Serbia	2017 World Cup qualifying	(Wales) Stebonheath Park, Llanelli	902
21 October 2016	Wales	16–16	Jamaica	Friendly	(England) Belle Vue, Wakefield	1,378
29 October 2016	Italy	14–20	Wales	2017 World Cup qualifying	(Italy) Stadio Brianteo, Monza	839
28 October 2017	Papua New Guinea	50–6	Wales	2017 World Cup	(Papua New Guinea) National Football Stadium, Port Moresby	14,800
5 November 2017	Wales	6–72	Fiji	2017 World Cup	(Australia) Townsville Stadium, Townsville	7,732
12 November 2017	Wales	6–34	Ireland	2017 World Cup	(Australia) Perth Rectangular Stadium, Perth	14,744
27 October 2018	France	54–18	Wales	2018 European Championship	(France) Stade Albert Domec, Carcassonne	4,055
2 November 2018	Scotland	12–50	Wales	2018 European Championship	(Scotland) Netherdale, Galashiels	≈250
11 November 2018	Wales	40–8	Ireland	2018 European Championship	(Wales) Racecourse Ground, Wrexham	1,257

== 2020s ==
Date	Home	Score	Away	Competition	Location	Attendance
19 June 2022	France	34–10	Wales	Friendly	(France) Albi Stadium, Albi	Unknown
8 October 2022	Wales	22–38	Lebanon	Friendly	(England) Heywood Road, Sale	Unknown
19 October 2022	Wales	12–18	Cook Islands	2021 World Cup	(England) Leigh Sports Village, Leigh	6,188
24 October 2022	Tonga	32–6	Wales	2021 World Cup	(England) Totally Wicked Stadium, St Helens	7,752
31 October 2022	Papua New Guinea	36–0	Wales	2021 World Cup	(England) Keepmoat Stadium, Doncaster	6,968
15 October 2024	Wales	22–16	Jamaica	Friendly	(Wales) The Gnoll, Neath	1,299
22 October 2024	Serbia	0–48	Wales	2026 World Cup European Qualifiers	(France) Stade Albert Domec, Carcassonne	
26 October 2024	France	48–6	Wales	2026 World Cup European Qualifiers	(France) Stade Municipal, Saint-Estève	
25 October 2025	Wales	24–0	Ireland	Two-match series friendly	(Wales) The Gnoll, Neath	
1 November 2025	Wales	12–36	Ireland	Two-match series friendly	(England) Post Office Road, Featherstone	
17 October 2026	Wales	44–12	United States	Friendly	(Wales) The Wern, Merthyr Tydfil	
24 October 2026	Scotland	0–38	Wales	Celtic Cup	(Scotland) Biggar RFC, Biggar	
31 October 2026	Wales	24–6	Ireland	Celtic Cup	(Wales) The Wern, Merthyr Tydfil	

== See also ==
- Rugby league in Wales
- List of Wales national rugby league team players
- Wales national rugby league team
- Wales A (Dragonhearts)
- Wales women's national rugby league team

== Sources ==
- international results website
