= Rugby League European Championship =

Rugby league football tournament

European Championship
- Current season, competition or edition: 2026 Rugby League European Championships
- Sport: Rugby league
- Founded: 1935; 91 years ago
- No. of teams: 8 (as of 2023)
- Country: Europe
- Most recent champion: France (9th title)
- Most titles: England (14 titles)
- Level on pyramid: 1
- Relegation to: European Championship B
- Website: Official website

The Rugby League European Championship (formerly known as the European Cup and European Nations Cup) is a rugby league football tournament for European national teams that was first held in 1935.

Originally, the European Cup had three teams, with England, Wales and France each playing each other once. Unlike the Tri-Nations series, there was no final; the team finishing at the top of the group was deemed the winner. From 1949 to 1956, a fourth Other Nationalities team entered the European Cup.

In 2003 the tournament rights were acquired by the European Rugby League and saw an expansion of the tournament reflecting the then recent growth of the sport across Europe.

== History ==
=== 1935–1996: Original competition ===
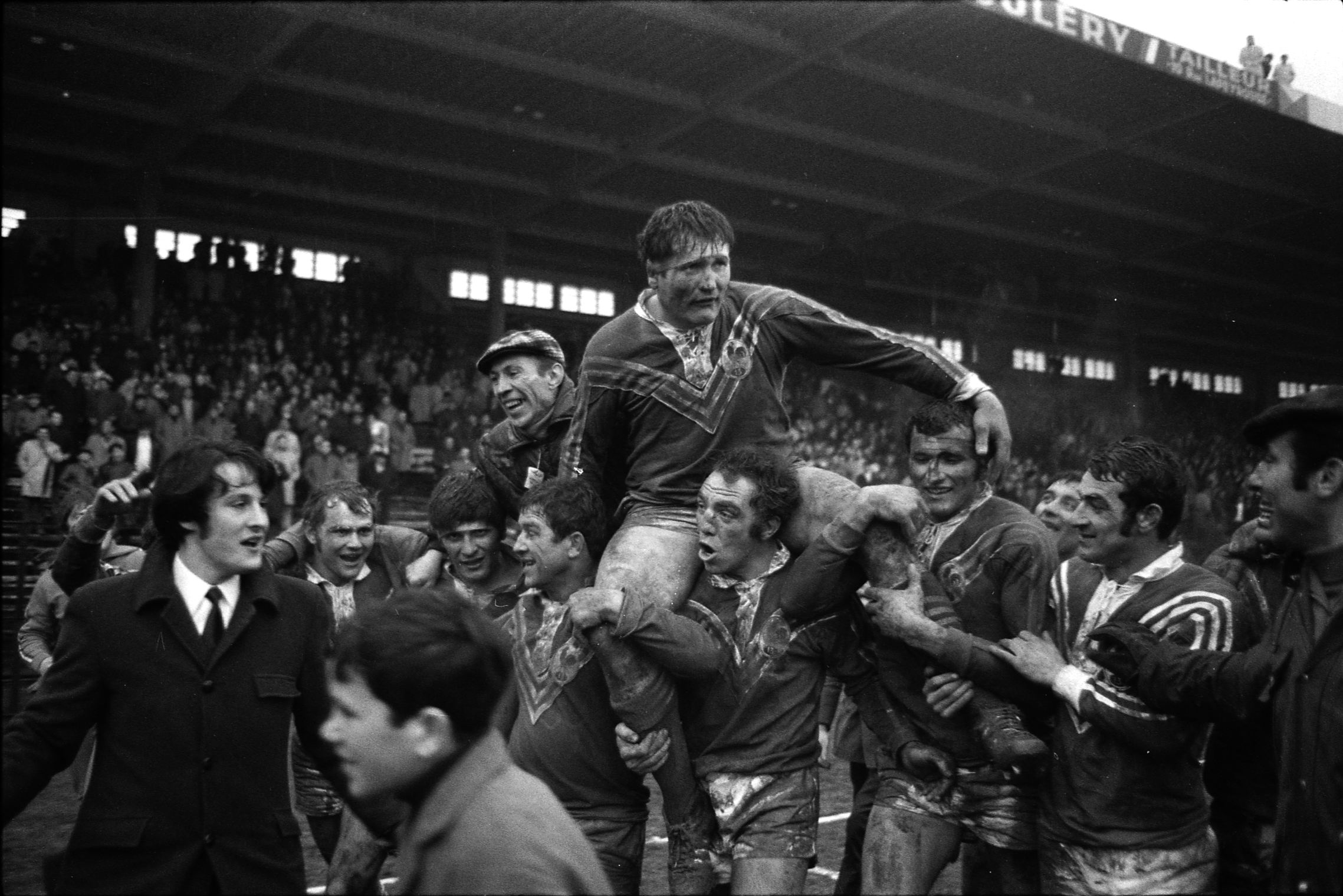
The French captain, Georges Ailleres, carried on his teammates' shoulders after a win against England during the 1969-70 tournament.

The Rugby League European Championships was originally a tri-nations tournament between England, Wales, and France playing each other in a single round robin. The tournament was played annually, with the exception of the years of the Second World War.

In 1946–47, the tournament was altered, with each team playing each other twice, home and away.

The 1949–50 tournament saw return to single round robin format. The tournament also saw the Other Nationalities team brought out of hiatus for the first time since the 1930s. This team consisted of players who were not English, Welsh, or French playing in the British and French leagues.

The 1955–56 tournament had no Welsh team, though Welsh players featured for Other Nationalities.

The tournament was not played again until 1969–70, and not again until 1975 with the original three-team format.

The tournament stayed as part of the calendar until 1981 where it was again cancelled thereafter, but saw a final revival in 1995 and 1996.

=== 2003–2006: Nations Cup era and RLEF control ===
In 2003, the Rugby League European Federation gained rights to the tournament and revived it under the name European Nations Cup. This saw the addition of Scotland, Ireland, and Russia with teams being split into two groups of three with the group winners competing in the final. The same format and teams featured in 2004.

The 2005 tournament saw England withdraw as a result of reduced competitiveness of the expanded tournament. A qualification tournament was held to find a team to replace England which saw Georgia beat Serbia and the Netherlands to earn the place.

The tournament again when on hiatus with plans to reform the top tier. 2006 saw the introduction of a B and C tournament as a result of the increased number of rugby league playering nations in Europe.

=== 2009–2018: European Cup era ===
The tournament returned in 2009 under the name European Cup under the same format as 2006 but with Serbia and Italy replacing Russia and Georgia. France were absence from the 2009 edition due being invited to the 2009 Rugby League Four Nations.

Poor performance from both newcomers would see the 2010 tournament reduced to four teams: France, Ireland, Scotland, and Wales under a single round robin reminiscent of the original tournament and played every two years. Wales won the tournament, thus qualified for the 2011 Rugby League Four Nations.

The 2012 tournament provided problems for the new biennial schedule. France and Wales opted out of the tournament, wanting stronger tests in preparation for the 2013 Rugby League World Cup, and arranged a separate tri-nations tournament with England. Italy and England reserves were asked to replace France and Wales though travel issues prevented Italy from participating. England reserves won the tournament.

The usual format was restored for the 2014 tournament which was won by Scotland, who as a result qualified for the 2016 Rugby League Four Nations. Learning from 2012, the 2016 tournament was held a year prior so as to not interfere with preparations for the 2017 World Cup.

The 2018 tournament acted as the 2021 Men's Rugby League World Cup European qualification tournament.

=== 2020–present: Competition reformat and continuous cancellations ===
The Rugby League European Federation announced changes for the 2020 tournament with promotion and relegation between each tier of the tournament for first and last place teams respectfully. The tournament was also expanded to include a D tier as well. The 2020 European Championship was to consist of six teams with one team being relegated to Euro B. In July 2020, the 2020 edition of the tournament was cancelled due to the COVID-19 pandemic.

The next tournament, scheduled for 2022 but pushed back to 2023 due to the postponement of the 2021 Rugby League World Cup due to the COVID-19 pandemic, was also cancelled due to the late withdrawal of France hosting the 2025 Rugby League World Cup as it could no longer be used as the European qualification tournament. This edition was set to feature a mass expansion of the tournament, featuring eight teams and the return of England. This edition would have also seen Euro C and D cancelled due to all teams moving up divisions in the expanded tournament.

In March 2025, the European Rugby League (ERL) announced the return of the tournament for Euro B, C, and D, with the competition returning to a three team per division competition. Competing nations were reseeded based on rank, with the 2025 and 2026 tournaments confirmed. The ERL stated its aim to restart Euro A in 2027 following the 2026 Men's Rugby League World Cup, with the top European teams unable to join earlier due to commitments in the qualification tournament for the World Cup.

== Team appearances ==
Team	Appearances	Debut	Most recent	Best result
France	32	1935	2023	Champions (9 times)
Wales	32	1935	2023	Champions (7 times)
England	30	1935	2023	Champions (14 times)
Scotland	9	2003	2023	Champions (2014)
Ireland	9	2003	2023	Runners-up (2004, 2012)
Other Nationalities	6	1949–50	1955–56	Champions (1952–53, 1955–56)
Russia	3	2003	2005	Group stage (2003, 2004, 2005)
Serbia	2	2009	2023	Group stage (2009)
Georgia	1	2005	2005	Group stage (2005)
Lebanon	1	2009	2009	Third place (2009)
England Knights	1	2012	2012	Champions (2012)
Italy	1	2023	2023	TBA
Spain	1	2023	2023	TBA

== Results ==
=== Championship era (1935–1996) ===
Season	Champions	Runners-up	Third place	Fourth place
1935	England	France	Wales	—
1935–36	Wales	England	France	—
1936–37	Wales	England	France	—
1938	Wales	England	France	—
1938–39	France	Wales	England	—
1945–46	England	France	Wales	—
1946–47	England	Wales	France	—
1947–48	England	France	Wales	—
1948–49	France	England	Wales	—
1949–50	England	Other Nationalities	Wales	France
1950–51	France	Other Nationalities	England	Wales
1951–52	France	England	Other Nationalities	Wales
1952–53	Other Nationalities	Wales	England	France
1953–54	England	Other Nationalities	France	Wales
1955–56	Other Nationalities	France	England	—
1969–70	England	France	Wales	—
1975	England	Wales	France	—
1977	France	Wales	England	—
1978	England	Wales	France	—
1979	England	France	Wales	—
1980	England	France	Wales	—
1981	France	England	Wales	—
1995	Wales	England	France	—
1996	England	Wales	France	—

=== Nations Cup era (2003–2005) ===
Season	Champions	Final Score	Runners-up	Group runners-up	
2003	England	68–6	France	Scotland	Ireland
2004	England	36–12	Ireland	Scotland	France
2005	France	38–16	Wales	Ireland	Russia

=== European Cup era (2009–2018) ===
Season	Champions	Runners-up	Third place	Fourth place
2009	Wales	Scotland	Lebanon	Ireland
2010	Wales	France	Scotland	Ireland
2012	England Knights	Ireland	Scotland	—
2014	Scotland	France	Ireland	Wales
2015	Wales	France	Ireland	Scotland
2018	France	Wales	Ireland	Scotland

== Summary ==
Champions	Count	Years
England	14	1935, 1945–46, 1946–47, 1947–48, 1949–50, 1953–54, 1969–70, 1975, 1978, 1979, 1980, 1996, 2003, 2004
France	9	1938–39, 1948–49, 1950–51, 1951–52, 1977, 1981, 2005, 2011, 2018
Wales	7	1935–36, 1936–37, 1938, 1995, 2009, 2010, 2015
Other Nationalities	2	1952–53, 1955–56
England Knights	1	2012
Scotland	1	2014

== See also ==
- Rugby League European Championship B
- Rugby League European Championship C
- Rugby League European Championship D
- Women's Rugby League European Championship
- Wheelchair Rugby League European Championship
- Rugby League Under-19 European Championship
