= England national rugby league team head coach =

There have been eighteen head coaches of the English national rugby league team since 1974. In the early years Great Britain played in major tournaments until the 1990s as the England team played sporadically in other competitions. The role is a part-time job so coaches can coach a domestic club team as well as the national team.

== History ==
=== Early years ===
Great Britain traditionally represented England and the home nations in major international tournaments. Occasionally England would participate in competitions such as the European Championships and made their World Cup debut in 1975. England coaches were sporadic and usually only coached a few games as they were on no long term contract.

=== More regular competition ===
In 1995, Phil Larder was brought in to replace Ellery Hanley before the 1995 World Cup in England, the first time England would play in their own World Cup. They reached the final for the second time in their history in their second World Cup but were defeated by Australia. They went on to win the European Championships the next year.

Larder's contract expired at the end of 1996 and the Rugby Football League (RFL) were looking for a new coach to take control in time for the 2000 World Cup which was again on home soil. They appointed Sheffield Eagles coach John Kear in 1999 after his Eagles side caused a huge Challenge Cup upset in 1998 when they defeated Wigan Warriors. He was given the task of leading England to a third consecutive World Cup final after the success of their 1995 campaign. However the 2000 World Cup was a huge failure with England being knocked out by Australia in the semi-finals by a wide margin and the entire competition being very one sided. Plans for a 2004 World Cup were then scrapped, however Kear stayed on to guide England to another European Championship in 2003 before leaving in 2004.

Kear was replaced by Karl Harrison who won the 2004 European Championships. This was the only international competition to be played until 2006 when Harrison was replaced by Paul Cullen who won the first and last Federation Shield comfortably in 2006.

=== First foreign coach ===
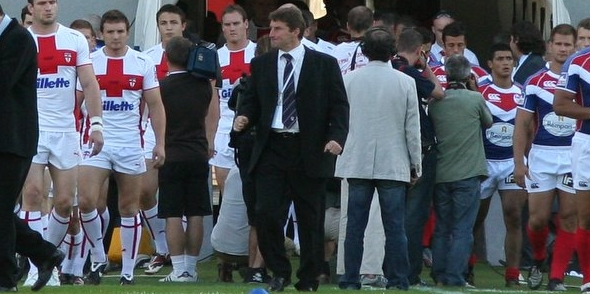
Smith leading England out as head coach in 2008

The RLIF announced plans for a World Cup to take place in Australia in 2008 and the RFL appointed their first foreign coach in 2007 by appointing then Leeds Rhinos coach Tony Smith. Smith took England to Australia and guided them to the semi-final where they were defeated by Australia again. The campaign was seen as a huge failure with reports from claiming there being a rift in the camp between Leeds Rhinos and St Helens players who mostly made up the team. The next year in 2009 a new competition was launched, the Four Nations which was held in England and France. England reached the final and but were unable to beat the Australians once again.

Smiths contract was not renewed in 2010 as the RFL wanted the new national team coach to be full-time. Many coaches did not want to leave their clubs to coach England full-time who only played once a year in a post season tournament. In 2010 Bradford Bulls coach Steve McNamara was appointed. His first tournament was the 2010 Four Nations in Australia and New Zealand where they failed to reach the final. The Four Nations returned to England in 2011 where they reached the final again with the chance to beat the Australians. They lost once again only managing to score one try. McNamara coach England in the mid season international against the Exiles, the best overseas Super League players in 2011 and 2012. In 2013 it was the first time a World Cup had been held in England since 2000. They reached the semi-finals where they lost to New Zealand in the dying seconds of the game having led for most of the match. The national team returned to Australia for the 2014 Four Nations where they failed to reach the final down under for the second time. In 2015 England replaced Great Britain to play New Zealand in the Baskerville Shield. They won the series 2-1, the first series win since Great Britain beat Australia in 2007 and McNamara's first piece of silverware of his managerial career. His contract was allowed to expire in 2016, he left as England's longest serving coach.

Brisbane Broncos head coach Wayne Bennett was appointed in 2016 to success McNamara.

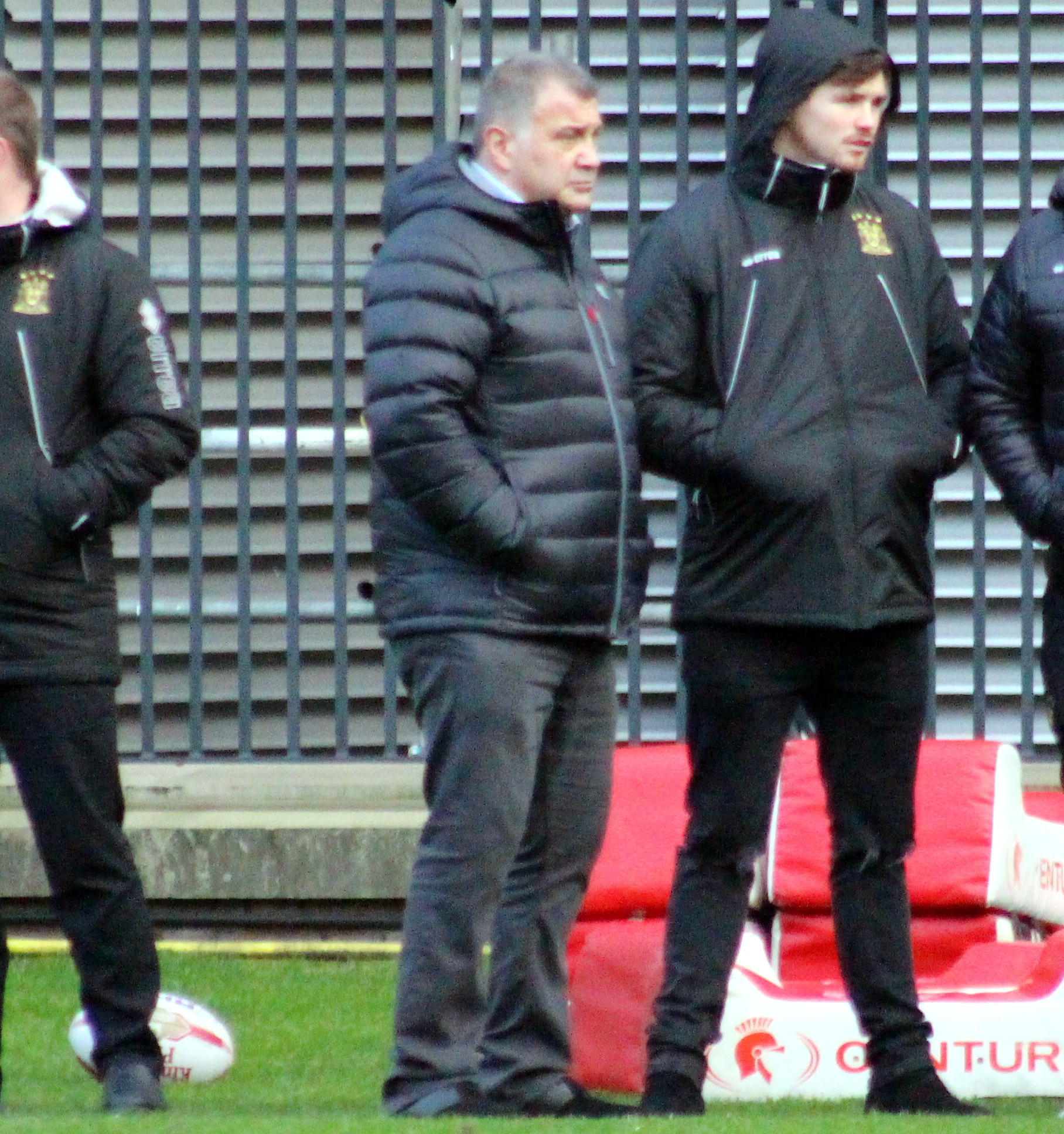
Wane alongside John Bateman in 2018

== Coaches ==
| Manager | England career | P | W | D | L | Win % | Competitions |
|---|---|---|---|---|---|---|---|
| (England) Alex Murphy | 1974–1975 | 12 | 8 | 2 | 2 | 66.7 | 1975 European Championship – Winner |
| (England) Peter Fox | 1977 | 2 | 0 | 0 | 2 | 0.0 | |
| (England) Frank Myler | 1978 | 2 | 2 | 0 | 0 | 100.0 | 1978 European Championship – Winner |
| (England) Eric Ashton | 1979–1980 | 2 | 2 | 0 | 0 | 100.0 | |
| (England) Johnny Whiteley | 1981 | 3 | 2 | 0 | 1 | 66.7 | |
| (England) Reg Parker | 1984 | 1 | 1 | 0 | 0 | 100.0 | |
| (England) Mal Reilly | 1992 | 1 | 1 | 0 | 0 | 100.0 | |
| (England) Ellery Hanley | 1995 | 2 | 1 | 0 | 1 | 50.0 | |
| (England) Phil Larder | 1995–1996 | 7 | 6 | 0 | 1 | 85.7 | 1995 World Cup – runners up 1996 European Championship – Winner |
| (England) Andy Goodway | 1998 | 1 | 1 | 0 | 0 | 100.0 | |
| (England) John Kear | 1999–2004 | 12 | 10 | 0 | 2 | 83.3 | 2000 World Cup – semi-final 2003 European Nations Cup – Winner |
| (England) Karl Harrison | 2004–2006 | 5 | 4 | 0 | 1 | 80.0 | 2004 European Championship – Winner |
| (England) Paul Cullen | 2006–2007 | 4 | 4 | 0 | 0 | 100.0 | 2006 Federation Shield – Winner |
| (Australia) Tony Smith | 2007–2009 | 12 | 7 | 0 | 5 | 58.3 | 2008 World Cup – semi-final 2009 Four Nations – runners up |
| (England) Steve McNamara | 2010–2016 | 30 | 17 | 1 | 12 | 56.7 | 2010 Four Nations – group stage 2011 Four Nations – runners up 2013 World Cup – semi-final 2014 Four Nations – group stage 2015 Baskerville Shield – Winner |
| (Australia) Wayne Bennett | 2016–2020 | 11 | 7 | 0 | 4 | 63.6 | 2016 Four Nations – group stage 2017 World Cup – runners up 2018 Baskerville Shield – Winner |
| (England) Shaun Wane | 2020–2026 | 18 | 14 | 0 | 4 | 77.8 | 2021 World Cup - semi-final |
| (England) Brian McDermott | 2026– | 3 | 2 | 0 | 1 | 66.7 | 2026 World Cup |

- This list of coaches is not fully complete
