= 1978 European Championship =

The 1978 European Championship may refer to European Championships held in several sports:

- 1978 European Rugby League Championship
- 1978 European Athletics Championships
