= 1975 European Championship =

1975 European Championship may refer to European Championships held in several sports:

- 1975 European Rugby League Championship
- EuroBasket 1975
