= Stade Bauer =

Football stadium in Saint-Ouen-sur-Seine, France

- Bauer
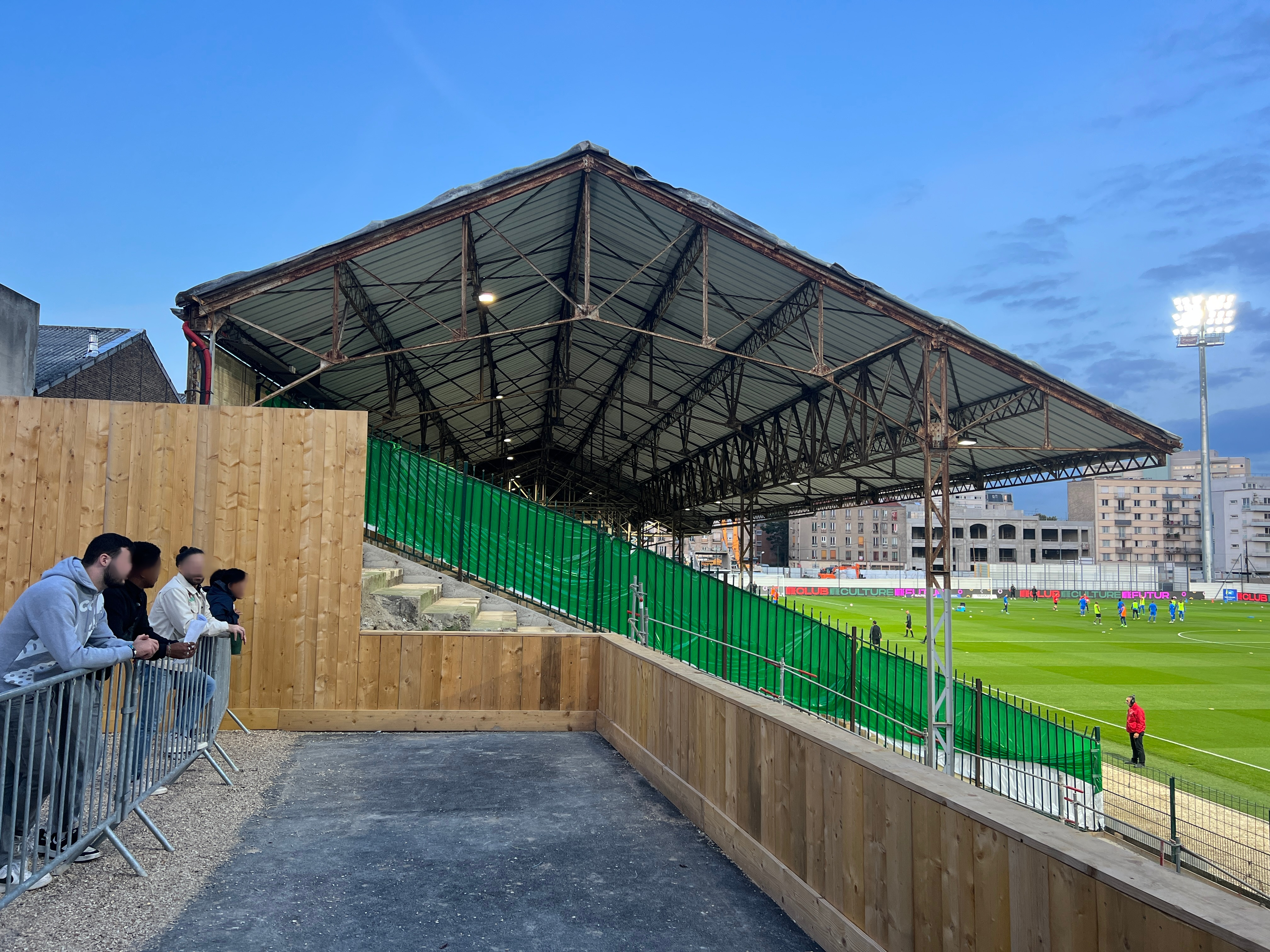
- Stade Bauer in 2022
- Interactive map of Stade Bauer
- Full name: Stade Bauer
- Former names: Stade de Saint-Ouen, Stade de Paris, Stade Municipal de Saint-Ouen.
- Location: Saint-Ouen-sur-Seine, France
- Coordinates: 48°54′21″N 2°20′27″E
- Owner: Groupe Réalités
- Capacity: 5,600 (Current); 10,000 (Target 2027)
- Surface: Natural
- Record attendance: 23,000 (Red Star vs. Marseille, 1948)

Construction
- Opened: 24 October 1909
- Renovated: 1922–1923, 1947, 1975, 2021–2027
- Expanded: 1947, 2024–2027
- Demolished: 2021–2022
- Architect: Groupe Réalités (2022)

Tenant
- Red Star

The Stade Bauer is a football stadium in Saint-Ouen-sur-Seine in the northern suburbs of Paris. It is the home ground of Ligue 2 club Red Star.

== History ==
It hosted some of the football events for the 1924 Summer Olympics. It also hosted a friendly game between Brazil and Andorra (3–0) right before the 1998 FIFA World Cup in France.

Stade de Paris was also the France national rugby league team's home ground for the 1935, 1936–37, 1938, and 1952–53 European Rugby League Championships.

In recent years the stadium has fallen into disrepair, having been damaged heavily by a storm in 1999, and also suffering from a lack of financial investment since.

In the 2016–17 season, Red Star F.C. played its home matches at Stade Jean-Bouin as Stade Bauer did not meet the public safety requirements for a French second tier stadium. Since the team's demotion to the Championnat National, the third tier of French football, the club have resumed occupancy of their traditional home ground.

On 18 May 2021, the enclosure was sold by the city of Saint-Ouen-sur-Seine to Groupe Réalités for a makeover. Reconstruction work started and would allow the Bauer Stadium to be in line with sporting ambitions of the Red Star in case of promotion in Ligue 2.

In January 2024, a new east stand of the stadium was inaugurated. The latter can accommodate 4,794 spectators. After the new South Stand with 834 seats, two of the four stands of the Bauer stadium are renovated and increase the capacity of the stadium to 5,600 seats. The promoter Réalités is officially launching at the same time the work on the “Bauer Box”, a set of homes adjoining the future North stand located on Rue du Docteur Bauer, as well as those on the future West stand of honour.

== Modern reconstruction and development ==
The "English-style" architectural vision for the stadium focuses on preserving its unique "popular" identity while bringing the stands closer to the pitch, further reinforcing the stadium's integration into the local urban fabric. The "Bauer Box" is a massive 30,000 m² urban project integrated into the stadium structure, intended to house shops, offices, a fitness center, and a health pole.

As of early 2026, the delivery of the North stand (Tribune Nord) is scheduled for the summer of 2026, while the final West stand (Tribune Ouest) is slated for completion in the summer of 2027.

However, the project entered a period of uncertainty at the beginning of 2026 due to the financial difficulties of the owner and project manager, Groupe Réalités, which was placed under receivership (redressement judiciaire) in February 2025. On 20 January 2026, the group's creditors approved a recovery plan involving a regional refocusing of the company. The final fate of the company and its ongoing commitments to the Stade Bauer reconstruction remain suspended pending a decision from the Nantes Commercial Court, expected on 18 February 2026.
