= 1938 European Championship =

The 1938 European Championship can refer to European Championships held in several sports:

- 1938 European Rugby League Championship
- 1938 European Championships in Athletics
- 1938 Grand Prix season
