= 1977 European Championship =

1977 European Championship may refer to European Championships held in several sports:

- 1977 European Rugby League Championship
- EuroBasket 1977
