= 1996 European Championship =

The 1996 European Championship can refer to European Championships held in several sports:

- 1996 European Indoor Championships in Athletics
- 1996 European Football Championship
- 1996 European Men's Handball Championship
- 1996 European Women's Handball Championship
- 1996 European Rugby League Championship
- 1996 European Amateur Boxing Championships
