= Richard Webster (rugby) =

Wales international dual-code rugby footballer

- Born: Richard Edward Webster; 9 July 1967 (age 59) Swansea, Wales
- School: Cefn Hengoed Comprehensive

Rugby union career
- Position: Flanker
Amateur team(s)
Years	Team	Apps	(Points)
–	Dunvant Juniors		
1985-1994	Swansea RFC	100	(171)
Senior career
Years	Team	Apps	(Points)
1997–99	Bath	26	(20)
International career
Years	Team	Apps	(Points)
1987–93	Wales	13	(4)
1993	British Lions	0	(0)
Coaching career
- Years: Team
- 2011: Wales U-20s
- Correct as of 21 May 2011
- Rugby league career

Playing information
Club
Years	Team	Pld	T	G	FG	P
1993–95	Salford Reds	51	13			52
Representative
Years	Team	Pld	T	G	FG	P
1994–96	Wales	6				8

Richard Webster (born 9 July 1967) is a Welsh former dual-code international rugby union and rugby league footballer who played in the 1980s and 1990s, and coached rugby union in the 2010s. In 1993 he toured New Zealand with the British & Irish Lions rugby union team and at the time played club rugby for Swansea RFC. He played 100 times for the Whites scoring 40 tries.

In 1993 Webster switched to rugby league to play second-row for Salford Reds. During the 1994 Kangaroo tour he was selected to play from the interchange bench for the Wales national rugby league team which hosted a match against the Australians. Webster also played for Wales in the 1995 Rugby League World Cup. He again played for Wales in the 1996 European Rugby League Championship, scoring a try against France in the first match.

In 1996 he returned to union and signed for Bath Rugby. At Bath he started in the victorious 1998 Heineken Cup Final as they defeated Brive.

In 2011 Webster was appointed head coach of the Wales national under-20 rugby union team following the departure of Darren Edwards. Webster played his junior rugby at Dunvant RFC coached Stuart Jones and Paul Piper.

Following his rugby days Webster completed several Ironman events at home and abroad. Due to old rugby injuries he completed these events on crutches
