= Parc des Sports (Avignon) =

Multi-purpose stadium in Avignon, France

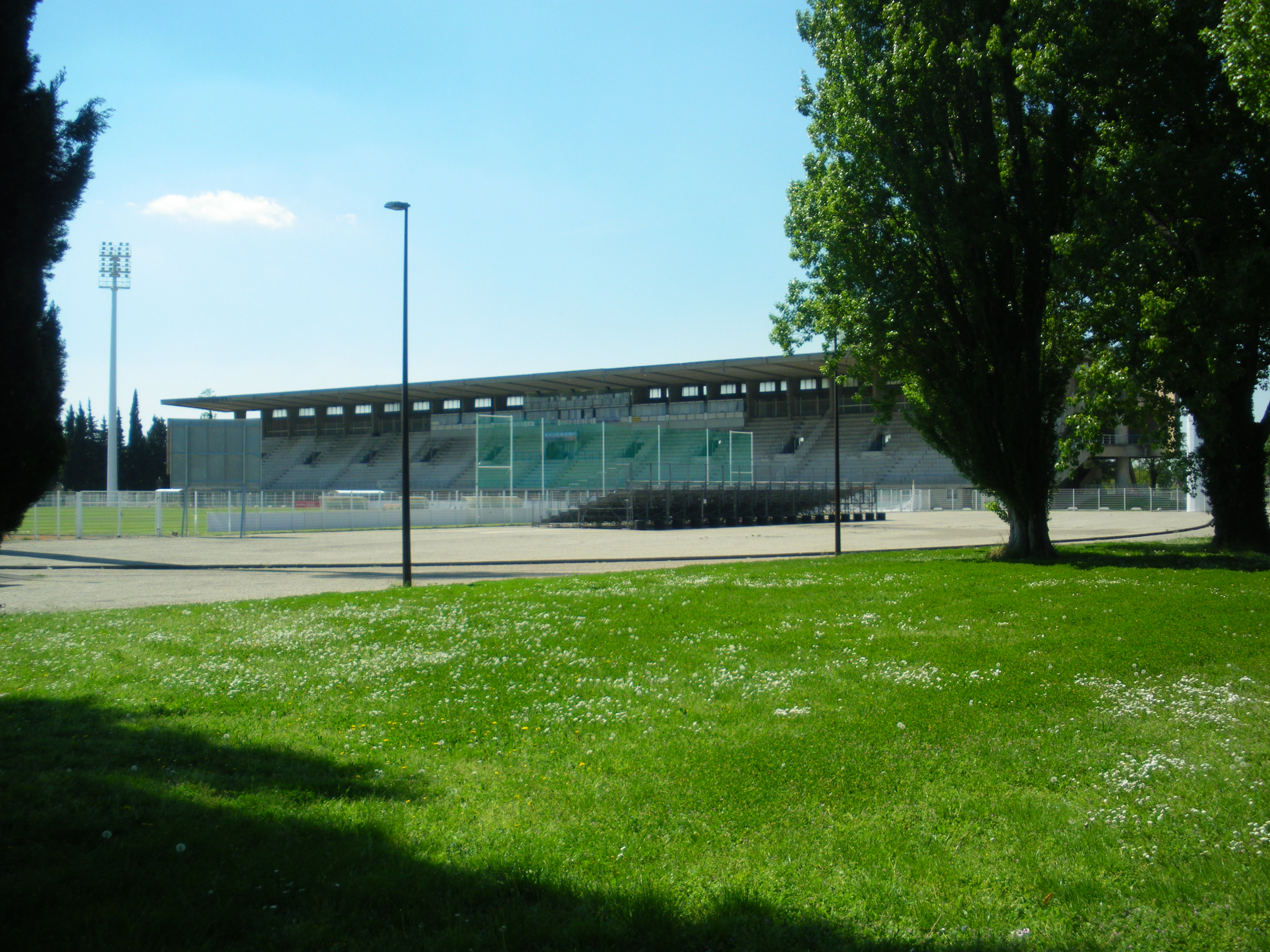
- Interactive map of Parc des Sports
- Location: Avignon, France
- Coordinates: 43°55′42″N 4°50′42″E
- Capacity: 17,518
- Surface: Grass

Construction
- Opened: 1975
- Renovated: 2009

Tenants
- AC Avignonnais; SO Avignon

Parc des Sports is a multi-purpose stadium in Avignon, France. It is currently used mostly for football matches and hosts the home matches of AC Avignonnais. The capacity of the stadium is 17,518 spectators.

== Rugby league ==
Since its opening in 1975, Parc des Sports has hosted fourteen France international rugby league matches with the first on 5 December 1982, when France hosted Australia as part of the 1982 Kangaroo tour. In front of 8,000 fans, Australia won the game 15–4 against a very committed French team (the 1982 Kangaroos were the first touring side to go through Great Britain and France undefeated earning them the nickname of "The Invincibles"). Its last international match was on Friday 1 November 2013, when the stadium hosted France's 2013 Rugby League World Cup game against New Zealand in front of a capacity crowd of 17,518.

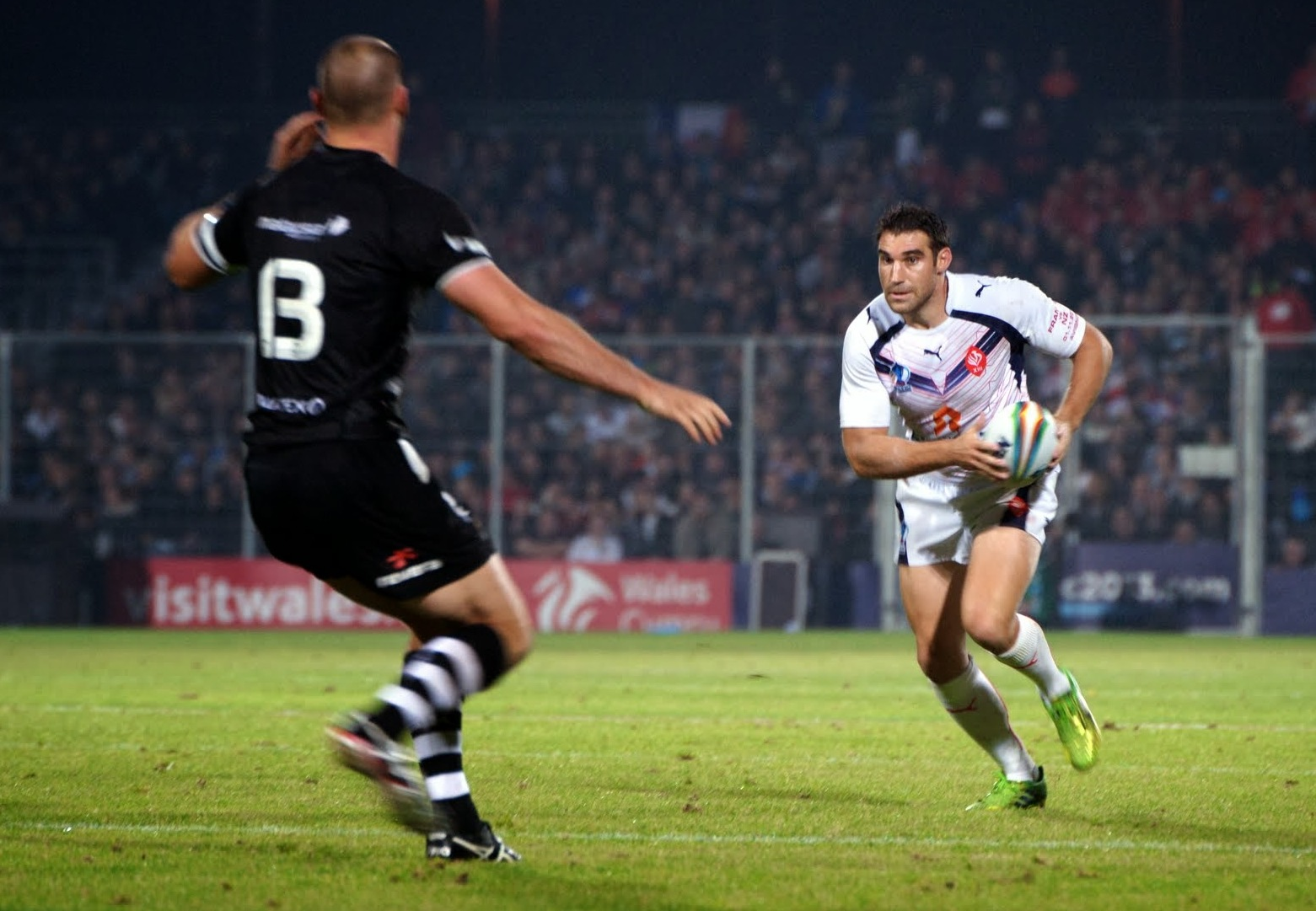
France vs New Zealand at Parc des Sports, Avignon. New Zealand won 48–0.

== Rugby league internationals ==
The France national team has played 15 test matches at the Parc des Sports (for a record of 3 wins, 11 losses and 1 draw) with the first held against Australia on 5 December 1982. The stadium also hosted a 2000 Rugby League World Cup qualifying match between Morocco and Lebanon in 1999.

Test#	Date	Result	Attendance	Notes
1	5 December 1982	Australia def. France 15–4	8,000	1982 Australia vs France series – 1st Test
2	29 January 1984	Great Britain def. France 12–0	4,000	
3	16 February 1986	France drew with Great Britain 14–14	4,000	1985-88 Rugby League World Cup
4	24 January 1988	Great Britain def. France 28–14	6,000	
5	5 February 1989	Great Britain def. France 30–8	6,500	
6	2 December 1990	Australia def. France 60–4	2,200	1990 Australia vs France series – 1st Test
7	17 November 1999	Italy def. France 14–10	1,000	1999 Mediterranean Cup
8	17 November 1999	Lebanon def. Morocco 104–0	1,000	2000 Rugby League World Cup qualifying
9	9 November 2003	Scotland def. France 8–6	2,200	2003 Rugby League European Cup
10	30 October 2004	England def. France 42–4	4,000	2004 Rugby League European Cup
11	7 November 2007	France def. Papua New Guinea 38–26	7,248	
12	9 October 2010	France def. Ireland 58–24	14,522	2010 Rugby League European Cup
13	21 October 2011	England def. France 32–18	16,866	
14	1 November 2013	New Zealand def. France 48–0	17,518	2013 Rugby League World Cup Group B
15	7 November 2015	France def. Scotland 32–18	5,737	2015 Rugby League European Cup
16	22 October 2016	England def. France 40–6	14,276	2016 Rugby League Four Nations
