= Rugby League Under-19 European Championship =

International youth rugby league tournament

- Most recent tournament 2026 Rugby League Under-19 European Championship
- Sport: Rugby league
- Instituted: 2018; 8 years ago
- Region: Europe (ERL)
- Holders: France (2026)
- Most titles: England (2 titles); France (2 titles)
- Related competition: Men's European Championship; Women's European Championship; Wheelchair European Championship

The Rugby League Under-19 European Championship is a rugby league tournament for men's youth national teams in Europe. The tournament was first held in 2018.

== History ==
Prior to the tournament's inauguration, a previous men's youth tournament was held in France in 2006 which saw hosts defeat England in the final.

The 2018 Rugby League Under-19 European Championship was the first edition of a revised format men's youth competition for teams in Europe. The tournament featured eight teams playing in a straight knockout tournament with ranking matches for the defeated sides. The tournament was hosted in Serbia and saw France win the inaugural edition.

The 2020 edition, scheduled to be held in Italy, was cancelled due to the COVID-19 pandemic after an initial postponement to 2021.

The tournament returned in 2022, with Italy staying on as host nation. The tournament format changed to a single round robin with the top four advancing to the knockout rounds. England won the final.

The 2024 tournament saw Serbia return as hosts, six teams competed and saw the lowest ranked teams play quarter finals before the winners were drawn against England and France for the semi-finals. Rankings game for defeated sides were again present. The United States made their debut in the tournament, which saw England retained their title.

The 2026 tournament will be held in France, and will see a change in the format. The top 6 teams will contest the Championship in a half round robin format (Note: See Groups B and C at the 2026 Men's Rugby League World Cup) where as the bottom four will contest the Shield.

== Results ==
=== List of Finals ===
| Year | Winners | Score | Runners-up | Ref. |
|---|---|---|---|---|
| (Serbia) 2018 | France | 26–24 | England | |
| (Italy) 2020 | Cancelled due to the COVID-19 pandemic | | | |
| (Italy) 2022 | England | 14–12 | France | |
| (Serbia) 2024 | England | 15–8 | France | |
| (France) 2026 | France | 48–12 (Note: The 2026 edition was played as a split single round robin. However, the final round fixture between France and England became the defacto final with no other teams able to win the competition at this point.) | England | |

=== 2018 ===
Bracket

Fifth Place Playoff
Serbia | 36
Ireland | 24
Seventh Place Playoff
Italy | 58
Ukraine | 6

Consolidation Semi Finals
Serbia | 54
Ukraine | 26
Ireland | 26
Italy | 10

Quarter Finals
Serbia | 0
England | 64
Wales | 90
Ukraine | 0
Ireland | 18
Scotland | 30
France | 70
Italy | 0

Semi Finals
Wales | 4
England | 48
France | 38
Scotland | 6

Final
France | 26
England | 24
Third Place Playoff
Scotland | 18
Wales | 42

Results

Quarter Final 1

5 August 2018
14:00 CEST (UTC+02:00)

| Serbia | 0–64 | England |
|---|---|---|
| | Report |

Makis Stadium, Belgrade, Serbia

Quarter Final 2

5 August 2018
16:00 CEST (UTC+02:00)

| Ireland | 18–30 | Scotland |
|---|---|---|
| | Report |

Makis Stadium, Belgrade, Serbia

Quarter Final 3

5 August 2018
17:30 CEST (UTC+02:00)

| Ukraine | 0–90 | Wales |
|---|---|---|
| | Report |

Makis Stadium, Belgrade, Serbia

Quarter Final 4

5 August 2018
18:00 CEST (UTC+02:00)

| France | 70–0 | Italy |
|---|---|---|
| | Report |

Makis Stadium, Belgrade, Serbia

Consolidation Semi Final 1

8 August 2018
14:00 CEST (UTC+02:00)

| Serbia | 54–26 | Ukraine |
|---|---|---|
| | Report |

Makis Stadium, Belgrade, Serbia

Semi Final 1

8 August 2018
16:00 CEST (UTC+02:00)

| Wales | 4–48 | England |
|---|---|---|
| | Report |

Makis Stadium, Belgrade, Serbia

Consolidation Semi Final 2

8 August 2018
17:30 CEST (UTC+02:00)

| Ireland | 28–10 | Italy |
|---|---|---|
| | Report |

Makis Stadium, Belgrade, Serbia

Semi Final 2

8 August 2018
18:00 CEST (UTC+02:00)

| France | 38–6 | Scotland |
|---|---|---|
| | Report |

Makis Stadium, Belgrade, Serbia

Seventh Place Playoff

11 August 2018
10:00 CEST (UTC+02:00)

| Italy | 58–6 | Ukraine |
|---|---|---|
| | Report |

Makis Stadium, Belgrade, Serbia

Fifth Place Playoff

11 August 2018
10:30 CEST (UTC+02:00)

| Serbia | 36–24 | Ireland |
|---|---|---|
| | Report |

Makis Stadium, Belgrade, Serbia

Third Place Playoff

11 August 2018
16:00 CEST (UTC+02:00)

| Scotland | 18–42 | Wales |
|---|---|---|
| | Report |

Makis Stadium, Belgrade, Serbia

Final

11 August 2018
18:00 CEST (UTC+02:00)

| France | 26–24 | England |
|---|---|---|
| | Report |

Makis Stadium, Belgrade, Serbia

=== 2024 ===
Bracket

Quarter Finals
Serbia | 24
Ukraine | 4
Scotland | 32
United States | 10

Semi Finals
England | 58
Ukraine | 4
France | 30
Scotland | 18
Fifth place playoff
United States | 28
Ukraine | 22

Final
England | 15
France | 8
Third place playoff
Serbia | 0
Scotland | 56

Results

Quarter Final 1

14 July 2024
18:00 CEST (UTC+02:00)

| Serbia | 4–24 | Ukraine |
|---|---|---|
| | Report |

Radnicki Stadium, Belgrade, Serbia

Quarter Final 2

15 July 2024
10:30 CEST (UTC+02:00)

| Scotland | 32–10 | United States |
|---|---|---|
| | Report |

Radnicki Stadium, Belgrade, Serbia

Third/Fifth place playoff qualifyer

17 July 2024
14:00 CEST (UTC+02:00)

| Serbia | 12–40 | United States |
|---|---|---|
| | Report |

Radnicki Stadium, Belgrade, Serbia

Semi Final 1

17 July 2024
16:00 CEST (UTC+02:00)

| England | 58–4 | Ukraine |
|---|---|---|
| | Report |

Radnicki Stadium, Belgrade, Serbia

Semi Final 2

17 July 2024
18:00 CEST (UTC+02:00)

| France | 30–18 | Scotland |
|---|---|---|
| | Report |

Radnicki Stadium, Belgrade, Serbia

Fifth place playoff

20 July 2024
14:00 CEST (UTC+02:00)

| United States | 26–22 | Ukraine |
|---|---|---|
| | Report |

Radnicki Stadium, Belgrade, Serbia

Third place playoff

20 July 2024
16:00 CEST (UTC+02:00)

| Serbia | 0–56 | Scotland |
|---|---|---|
| | Report |

Radnicki Stadium, Belgrade, Serbia

Final

20 July 2024
18:00 CEST (UTC+02:00)

| England | 15–8 | France |
|---|---|---|
| | Report |

Radnicki Stadium, Belgrade, Serbia

=== 2026 ===
Table

| Pos | Pool | Team | Pld | W | D | L | PF | PA | PD | Pts | Qualification |
|---|---|---|---|---|---|---|---|---|---|---|---|
| 1 | B | France | 3 | 3 | 0 | 0 | 250 | 24 | +226 | 6 | Champions |
| 2 | A | England | 3 | 2 | 0 | 1 | 110 | 62 | +48 | 4 | |
| 3 | B | Wales | 3 | 2 | 0 | 1 | 116 | 86 | +30 | 4 | |
| 4 | B | Ukraine | 3 | 1 | 0 | 2 | 86 | 144 | −58 | 2 | |
| 5 | A | Scotland | 3 | 1 | 0 | 2 | 72 | 178 | −106 | 2 | |
| 6 | A | Serbia | 3 | 0 | 0 | 3 | 72 | 212 | −140 | 0 | |

Source: [Source]

| Pos | Team | Pld | W | D | L | PF | PA | PD | Pts | Qualification |
|---|---|---|---|---|---|---|---|---|---|---|
| 1 | Greece | 3 | 3 | 0 | 0 | 168 | 46 | +122 | 6 | Shield Winners |
| 2 | Ireland | 3 | 2 | 0 | 1 | 130 | 94 | +36 | 4 | |
| 3 | Canada | 3 | 1 | 0 | 2 | 104 | 112 | −8 | 2 | |
| 4 | Norway | 3 | 0 | 0 | 3 | 54 | 204 | −150 | 0 | |

Source: [Source]

Round 1

Shield

12 July 2026
10:00 CEST (UTC+02:00)

| Greece | 38–22 | Ireland |
|---|---|---|
| | Report |

CREPS, Font Romeu, France

Shield

12 July 2026
12:00 CEST (UTC+02:00)

| Norway | 32–46 | Canada |
|---|---|---|
| | Report |

CREPS, Font Romeu, France

Championship

12 July 2026
14:00 CEST (UTC+02:00)

| England | 70–8 | Ukraine |
|---|---|---|
| | Report |

CREPS, Font Romeu, France

Championship

12 July 2026
16:00 CEST (UTC+02:00)

| France | 96–6 | Scotland |
|---|---|---|
| | Report |

CREPS, Font Romeu, France

Championship

12 July 2026
18:00 CEST (UTC+02:00)

| Serbia | 30–52 | Wales |
|---|---|---|
| | Report |

CREPS, Font Romeu, France

Round 2

Shield

15 July 2026
10:00 CEST (UTC+02:00)

| Norway | 16–64 | Ireland |
|---|---|---|
| | Report |

CREPS, Font Romeu, France

Shield

15 July 2026
12:00 CEST (UTC+02:00)

| Canada | 18–36 | Greece |
|---|---|---|
| | Report |

CREPS, Font Romeu, France

Championship

15 July 2026
14:00 CEST (UTC+02:00)

| Scotland | 38–24 | Ukraine |
|---|---|---|
| | Report |

CREPS, Font Romeu, France

Championship

15 July 2026
16:00 CEST (UTC+02:00)

| France | 106–6 | Serbia |
|---|---|---|
| | Report |

CREPS, Font Romeu, France

Championship

15 July 2026
18:00 CEST (UTC+02:00)

| England | 28–6 | Wales |
|---|---|---|
| | Report |

CREPS, Font Romeu, France

Round 3

Shield

18 July 2026
10:00 CEST (UTC+02:00)

| Greece | 94–6 | Norway |
|---|---|---|
| | Report |

CREPS, Font Romeu, France

Shield

18 July 2026
12:00 CEST (UTC+02:00)

| Canada | 40–44 | Canada |
|---|---|---|
| | Report |

CREPS, Font Romeu, France

Championship

18 July 2026
14:00 CEST (UTC+02:00)

| Serbia | 36–54 | Ukraine |
|---|---|---|
| | Report |

CREPS, Font Romeu, France

Championship

18 July 2026
16:00 CEST (UTC+02:00)

| Scotland | 28–58 | Wales |
|---|---|---|
| | Report |

CREPS, Font Romeu, France

Championship

18 July 2026
18:00 CEST (UTC+02:00)

| France | 48–12 | England |
|---|---|---|
| | Report |

CREPS, Font Romeu, France
