= Knowsley Road =

Home ground of St. Helens from 1890 until its closure in 2010

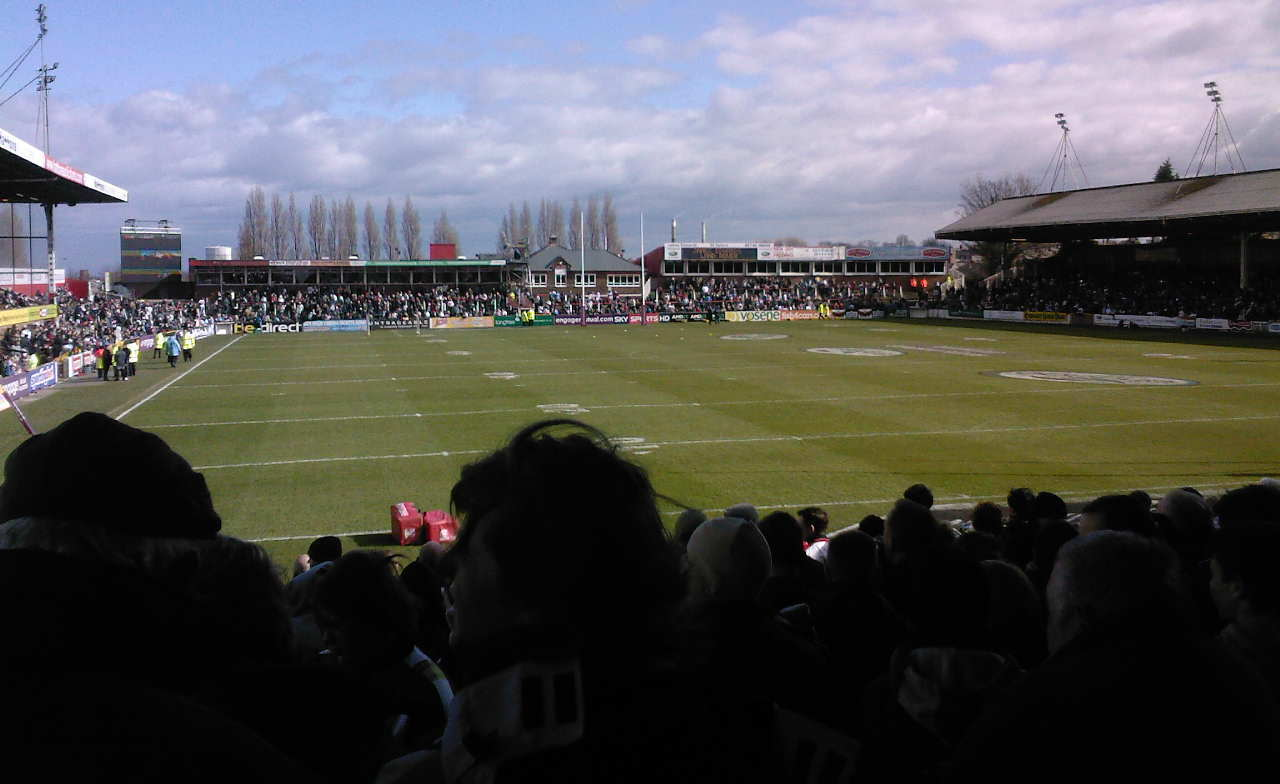
- Interactive map of Knowsley Road
- Full name: Knowsley Road
- Former names: GPW Recruitment Stadium (2008–2010)
- Location: St Helens, Merseyside
- Coordinates: 53°27′6″N 2°45′52″W
- Owner: St Helens
- Operator: St Helens
- Capacity: 17,500
- Surface: Grass
- Record attendance: 35,695 vs Wigan 26 December 1949

Construction
- Groundbreaking: 1890
- Built: 1890
- Opened: 1890
- Renovated: 2006
- Expanded: 1960
- Closed: 2010
- Demolished: 2011

Tenants
- St. Helens (1890–2010); St Helens Town FC (2002–2010)

Knowsley Road was a former rugby league stadium in Eccleston, St Helens, Merseyside. It was the home ground of St. Helens RFC from 1890 until its closure in 2010. St Helens Town FC also played their home fixtures at Knowsley Road from 2002 until 2010 and, for a period, the venue hosted Liverpool F.C. Reserves. The stadium was demolished during spring 2011 and a new construction then known as Cunningham Grange, named after club legend Keiron Cunningham, was built on the site.

== Stadium ==
Knowsley Road consisted of four stands of open terracing and one seated stand called the Family Stand.

=== Family Stand ===
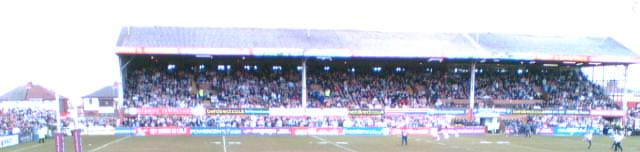
Family Stand

The Family Stand was the only section of the stadium which had a seated area, although there were still areas for standing supporters. The players entered the field from a gateway under the stand and the dugout was also in the Family Stand. The Family Stand contained an area for the media such as local radio stations. It was built after the Second World War, funded by local businesses. The actual design of the stand means that it only ran for two-thirds of that side of the pitch.

When the Main Stand was built, it provided a new changing room facility and gymnasium for the players, replacing the smaller, outdated ones at the old Pavilion End of the ground, next to the scoreboard. Players would come out of the new tunnel before kick off to a centralised view of the stadium, facing the Popular Stand.

When the Main Stand was constructed, it created an overhang at the top of the stand. This was because the old Eccleston railway ran below the site of the new stand, linking the Triplex (Pilkington) factory to the town centre. The railway has long gone now, and was replaced by the club's car park.

=== Popular Stand ===
The Popular Stand was an all standing section of the ground and was the most popular stand for home supporters. The stand was built in the 1960s at a cost of over £30,000. It spread across the full length of the pitch. It held the Scaff – the gantry in which the press gathered. When St Helens were on television, the Popular Stand regularly were heard singing and chanting due to the small distance between the cameras and the supporters.

=== Dunriding Lane End ===
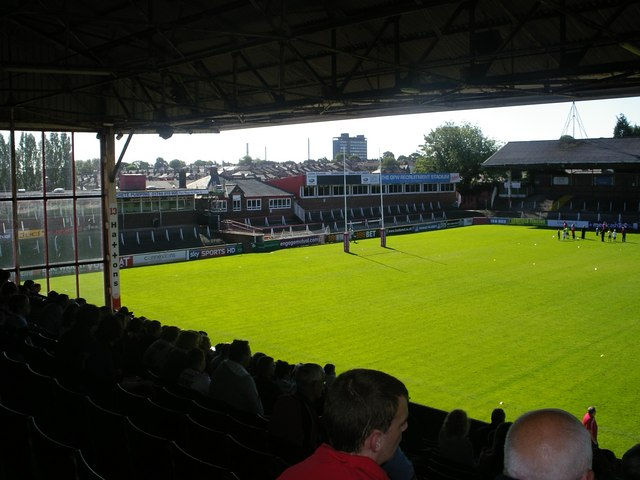
View out towards the Dunriding Lane End

The Dunriding Lane End was the only stand without a roof. It contained nine corporate boxes, as well as the stadium restaurant and the official store. Prior to being moved to the Family Stand, the changing rooms were at the Dunriding Lane End and players would enter from a tunnel.

The Dunriding Lane End of the ground was known as the Boys' Pen – a spot where die-hard fans congregated during the post-war years. During the 1970s, and 1980s, the club became aware of the need for corporate facilities in line with other clubs and the decision was made to build a bar, restaurant and executive boxes for the fans, and to give them a new and luxurious match day experience.

=== Eddington End ===
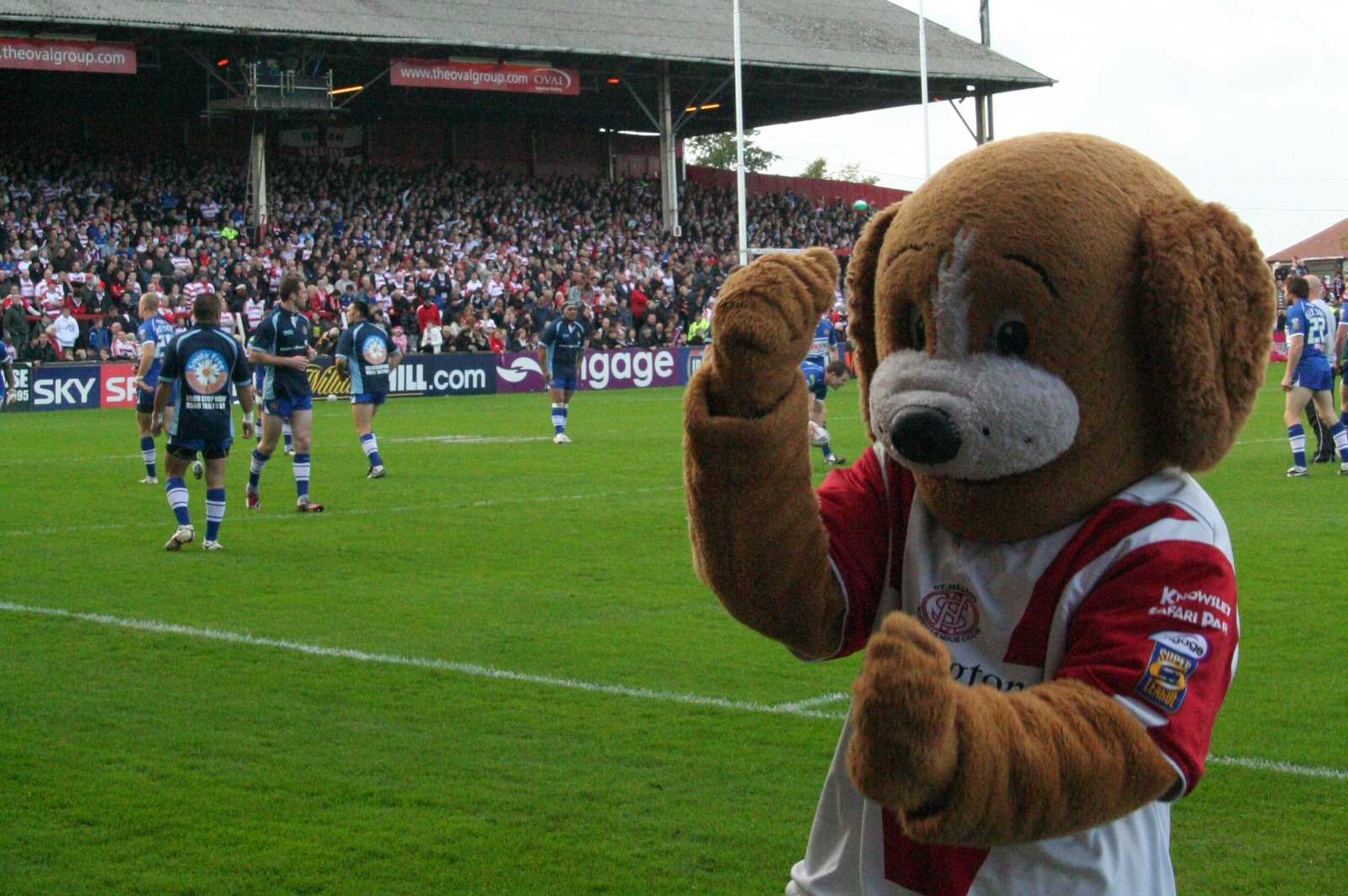
View out towards the Eddington End

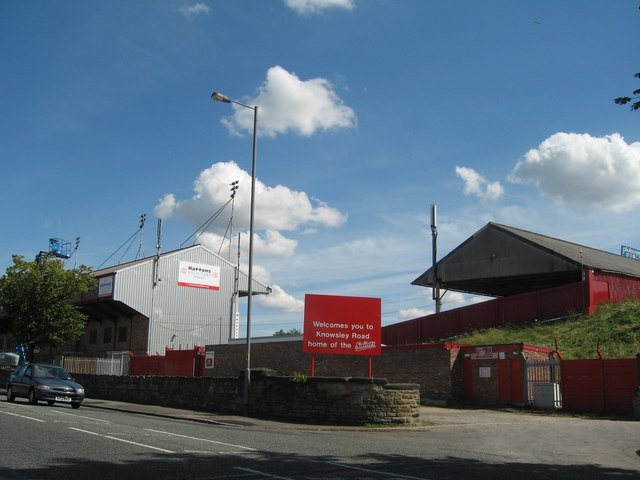
View out towards the Dunriding Lane End and the Family Stand

The Eddington End was a typical Kop. It was the second biggest stand overall at the ground, and the tallest, with the best views of the pitch. In the 1960s, a roof was placed on the Eddington End of the ground. The Eddington End is generally an away end, where most away fans congregated on match days. It became a haunt for local derby chanting with fans of arch rivals Wigan.

== History ==
St. Helens moved to Knowsley Road in 1890, defeating Manchester Rangers in their first match. The stadium pre-dated the birth of the Northern Rugby Football Union (which would later become rugby league) by five years. Having been formed in 1873, St. Helens were a rugby union club when they moved into Knowsley Road. The stadium changed in appearance very little in its 120 years.

Lord Derby open the new pavilion on 26 December 1920 at a match against Wigan. A ground record of 35,695 fans turned up to watch Saints play Wigan on Boxing Day 1949. In January 1950, the training pitch was laid down. In February 1951, the newly completed Eccleston Kop covered enclosure was opened and was named after Supporters' Club Secretary George Eddington. In August 1958, the club's new grandstand was opened by Sir Harry Pilkington. The structure cost £32,000 and could seat 2,400.

In September 1961, new metal goal posts replaced the wooden originals after storm damage. The new popular side enclosure was erected in 1962. The old wooden structure that it replaced was given to Liverpool City for their ground at Knotty Ash. Saints' new floodlighting system opened by Sir Harry Pilkington on 27 January 1965. The bar and restaurant complex was opened at Dunriding Lane End of the Knowsley Road stadium in 1973.

Players' dug outs were moved from the Main Stand to the Popular Side in 1983. In September 1989, work started on nine executive boxes and an electronic scoreboard at the Dunriding Lane End.

In 2006, Knowsley Road was renovated slightly. On the club's new sponsorship deal with Earth Money, the stadium got new signs, new dug outs were installed, as were the toilet facilities which had been long complained about by supporters.

In 2006, Knowsley Road was approved as an international Test venue after safety and capacity improvements. It subsequently hosted an international test fixture in 2006 between Great Britain and New Zealand, which Great Britain won.

In June 2007, club chairman Eamonn McManus announced plans for a new 18,000 capacity stadium, with a Tesco store and plaza with 2,000 car parking spaces for the 2011 Super League Season. These plans were approved by local councillors in May 2008. Plans were put on hold and building work did not start on time. Knowsley Road was closed at the end of the 2010 Super League Season and St Helens played their home games at Widnes' Stobart Stadium for the 2011 Super League Season.

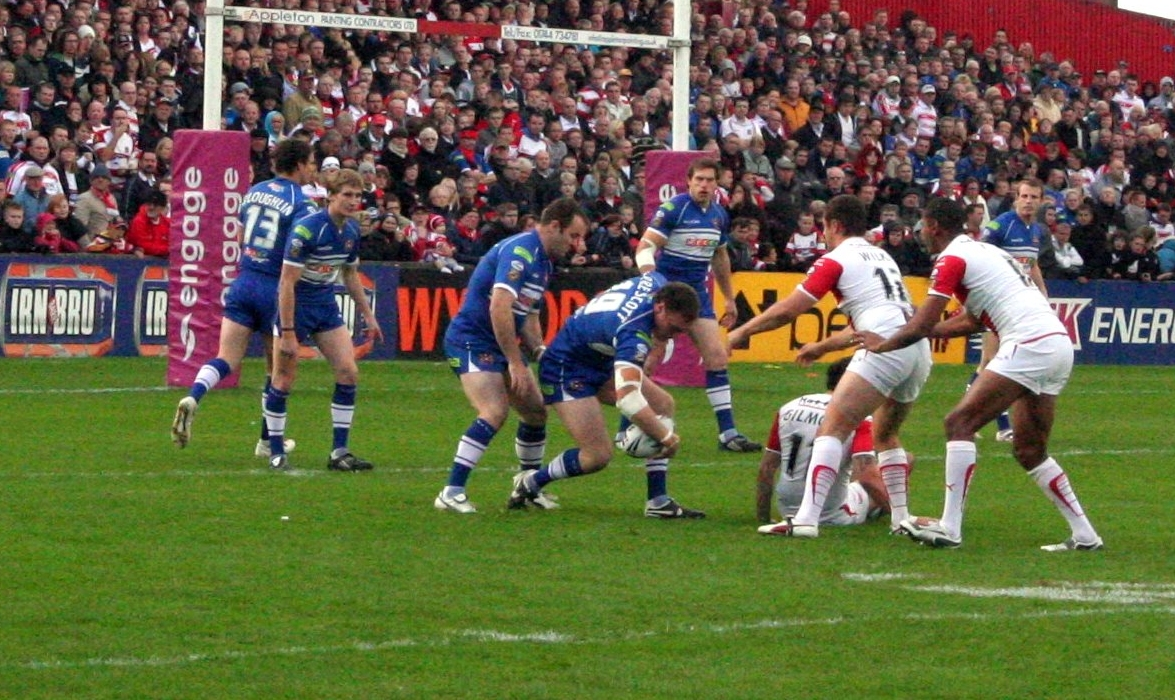
Wigan v Saints in front of the away fans in the Eddington End in the derby in 2009

The last first team match at Knowsley Road was the St. Helens vs Huddersfield game, a play-off semi-final on 24 September 2010. St. Helens won 42–22, the final try on the ground being scored by retiring club captain Keiron Cunningham.

== Stadium records ==
game	Date	Teams	Attendance	Notes
1	26 December 1949	St Helens vs Wigan	35,695	Knowsley Road attendance record
2	26 August 1996	St Helens vs Warrington	18,098	Super League attendance record
3	10 April 1957	Great Britain vs France	23,250	Test match attendance record
4	10 October 1959	St Helens vs Australia	29,156	Tour match attendance record

== Rugby League Test matches ==
List of rugby league test matches played at Knowsley Road.

Test No.	Date	Result	Attendance	Notes
1	14 February 1914	England def. Wales 16–12	10,000	
2	25 February 1939	France def. England 12–9	8,557	1938–39 European Rugby League Championship
3	19 September 1951	England def. Wales 35–11	20,918	1951–52 European Rugby League Championship
4	16 September 1953	England def. Wales 24–5	19,357	1953–54 European Rugby League Championship
5	10 April 1957	Great Britain def. France 29–14	23,250	
6	22 November 1958	France def. England 26–8	16,000	
7	26 March 1960	Great Britain drew with France 17–17	13,165	
8	28 January 1961	Great Britain def. France 27–8	14,804	
9	30 November 1969	Great Britain def. France 34–10	6,080	
10	17 March 1971	Great Britain def. France 24–2	7,783	
11	28 May 1978	England def. Wales 60–13	9,759	1978 European Rugby League Championship
12	13 October 1995	New Zealand def. Papua New Guinea 22–6	8,679	1995 Rugby League World Cup Group B
13	1 November 2000	England def. Russia 76–4	5,736	2000 Rugby League World Cup Group 1
14	28 June 2006	Great Britain def New Zealand 46–14	10,103	2006 Baskerville Shield

== Rugby League Tour Matches ==
Other than St Helens club games, Knowsley Road also saw St Helens, a combined St Helens – St Helens Recs XIII, the county team Lancashire and an English League XIII play host to international touring teams from Australia (sometimes playing as Australasia), New Zealand and France from 1907–2002.

Game	Date	Result	Attendance	Notes
1	30 October 1907	New Zealand def. St Helens 24–5		1907–08 All Golds tour
2	22 February 1908	New Zealand def. St Helens 21–10	4,000	1907–08 All Golds tour
3	9 February 1909	St Helens def. Australia 9–0	1,500	1908–09 Kangaroo Tour
4	14 October 1911	Australasia def. St Helens 16–5	12,000	1911–12 Kangaroo Tour
5	23 November 1921	Australasia def. St Helens 16–8	6,000	1921–22 Kangaroo Tour
6	16 November 1929	St Helens drew with Australia 18–18	9,500	1929–30 Kangaroo Tour
7	2 December 1933	Australia def. St Helens 20–11	5,735	1933–34 Kangaroo Tour
8	2 December 1937	Australia def. St Helens / St Helens Recs XIII 15–7	2,000	1937–38 Kangaroo tour
9	2 September 1939	New Zealand def. St Helens 19–3	4,000	1939 New Zealand Kiwis tour
10	25 September 1947	New Zealand def. St Helens 11–5	22,000	1947-48 New Zealand Kiwis tour
11	14 October 1948	St Helens def. Australia 10–8	20,175	1948–49 Kangaroo Tour
12	30 August 1950	Italy def. St Helens 74–38	14,000	1950 Italy Tour
13	20 October 1951	New Zealand def. St Helens 33–10	18,210	1951–52 New Zealand Kiwis tour
14	27 September 1952	St Helens def. Australia 26–8	17,205	1952–53 Kangaroo Tour
15	26 October 1955	St Helens def. New Zealand 16–8	11,327	1955–56 New Zealand Kiwis tour
16	24 November 1956	St Helens def. Australia 44–2	15,579	1956–57 Kangaroo Tour
17	23 September 1959	Lancashire def. Australia 30–22	15,743	1959–60 Kangaroo Tour
18	10 October 1959	Australia def. St Helens 15–2	29,156	1959–60 Kangaroo Tour
19	22 November 1959	France def. Rugby League XIII 26–8	16,000	Friendly
20	12 October 1960	St Helens def. Australia 15–12	12,250	Australian 1960 Rugby League World Cup tour
21	14 October 1961	St Helens def. New Zealand 25–10	21,680	1961 New Zealand Kiwis tour
22	28 September 1963	Australia def. St Helens 8–2	21,284	1963–64 Kangaroo Tour
23	15 September 1965	St Helens def. New Zealand 28–7	11,270	1965 New Zealand Kiwis tour
24	13 October 1965	New Zealand def. Lancashire 21–10	8,781	1965 New Zealand Kiwis tour
25	24 October 1967	St Helens def. Australia 8–4	17,275	1967–68 Kangaroo Tour
26	9 November 1970	St Helens def. Australia 37–10	15,570	Australian 1970 Rugby League World Cup tour
27	6 September 1971	St Helens def. New Zealand 18–8	8,169	1971 New Zealand Kiwis tour
28	15 November 1972	Australia def. St Helens 24–9	10,000	Australian 1972 Rugby League World Cup tour
29	13 November 1973	St Helens def. Australia 11–7	10,013	1973 Kangaroo Tour
30	12 October 1975	Australia def. St Helens 32–7	10,170	Australian 1975 Rugby League World Cup tour
31	12 November 1978	Australia def. St Helens 26–6	16,352	1978 Kangaroo Tour
32	31 October 1979	St Helens Amateurs def. Papua New Guinea 19–17	4,000	1979 Papua New Guinea tour
33	12 October 1980	St Helens def. New Zealand 11–6	6,000	1980 New Zealand Kiwis tour
34	17 October 1982	Australia def. St Helens 32–0	8,190	1982 Kangaroo Tour
35	27 October 1985	New Zealand def. St Helens 46–8	7,897	1985 New Zealand Kiwis tour
36	2 November 1986	Australia def. St Helens 32–8	15,381	1986 Kangaroo Tour
37	31 October 1987	Lancashire drew with Papua New Guinea 22–22	4,202	1987 Papua New Guinea Tour
38	1 October 1989	St Helens def. New Zealand 27–26	6,940	1989 New Zealand Kiwis tour
39	7 October 1990	Australia def. St Helens 34–4	15,219	1990 Kangaroo Tour
40	20 October 1993	New Zealand def. St Helens 14–8	8,170	1993 New Zealand Kiwis tour
41	1 November 1994	Australia def. St Helens 32–14	13,911	1994 Kangaroo Tour
42	25 October 2002	New Zealand def. St Helens 38–26	5,162	2002 New Zealand Kiwis tour

== See also ==
- English rugby league stadia by capacity
- Development of stadiums in English football
