= 1995 European Rugby League Championship =

1995 European Championship
- Number of teams: 3
- Winner: Wales (4th title)
- Matches played: 3

Wales won the new European Championship, beating England for the first time since 1977 and defeating France in Carcassonne to the first time take home the new title for the first time since 1938.

It was the first time a European Championship had been held since being cancelled after last tournament in 1981. The traditional format was used, whereby the three founding nations compete, each playing a total of two matches, where no final is staged.

It was held in early 1995, to accommodate for the Rugby League World Cup taking place in the latter stages of the same year.

== Results ==
1 February

Wales	18 – 16	England
Tries: Kevin Ellis (2) Goals: Jonathan Davies (2); Field Goals: Jonathan Davies (2)	report	Tries: Richard Gay; Deryck Fox; Jason Robinson; Goals: Garry Schofield (2)

Ninian Park, Cardiff
Attendance: 6,252

15 February

England	19 – 16	France
Tries: Paul Broadbent; Francis Cummins; Nick Pinkney; Goals: Deryck Fox (3); Field Goals: Nigel Wright (1)	report	Tries: Frederic Banquet (2); Jean-Marc Garcia Goals: Stephane Millet (2)

Gateshead International Stadium, Gateshead
Attendance: 6,103

5 March

France	10 – 22	Wales
Tries: Jean-Marc Garcia; Bernard Llong Goals: Stephane Millet (1)	report	Tries: Allan Bateman (2); Iestyn Harris; Paul Atcheson; Goals: Jonathan Davies (3)

Stade d'Albert Domec, Carcassonne
Attendance: 5,000

=== Final standings ===
Team	Played	Won	Drew	Lost	For	Against	Diff	Points
Wales	2	2	0	0	40	26	+14	4
England	2	1	0	1	35	34	+1	2
France	2	0	0	2	26	41	−15	0
