= 1955–56 European Rugby League Championship =

1955–56 European Championship
- Number of teams: 3
- Winner: Other nationalities (2nd title)
- Matches played: 3

This was the fifteenth European Championship and was won for the second time by the Other Nationalities.

== Results ==
12 September

England	16 – 33	Other nationalities

Central Park, Wigan
Attendance: 18,234

19 October

Other nationalities	32 – 19	France

Hilton Park, Leigh
Attendance: 7,000

10 May

France	23 – 9	England

Stade de Gerland, Lyon

=== Final standings ===
Team	Played	Won	Drew	Lost	For	Against	Diff	Points
Other nationalities	2	2	0	0	65	35	+30	4
France	2	1	0	1	42	41	+1	2
England	2	0	0	2	25	56	−31	0
