= 1946–47 European Rugby League Championship =

1946–47 European Championship
- Number of teams: 3
- Winner: England (3rd title)
- Matches played: 6

The 1946-47 European Championship saw a change of format, where each nation played each other twice, instead of once, both at a home and away venue. This was the sixth competition and was won by England.

== Results ==
12 October

England	10 – 13	Wales

Station Road, Swinton
Attendance: 20,213

16 November

Wales	5 – 19	England

St Helens Rugby Ground, Swansea
Attendance: 25,000

8 December

France	0 – 3	England

Stade du Parc Lescure, Bordeaux
Attendance: 24,100

18 January

France	14 – 5	Wales

Stade Vélodrome, Marseille
Attendance: 24,500

12 April

Wales	17 – 15	France

St Helens Rugby Ground, Swansea
Attendance: 12,000

17 May

England	5 – 2	France

Headingley, Leeds
Attendance: 21,000

=== Final standings ===
Team	Played	Won	Drew	Lost	For	Against	Diff	Points
England	4	3	0	1	37	20	+17	6
Wales	4	2	0	2	40	58	−18	4
France	4	1	0	3	31	30	+1	2
