= 1935–36 European Rugby League Championship =

1935–36 European Championship
- Number of teams: 3
- Winner: Wales (1st title)
- Matches played: 3

This was the second European Championship held and was won by Wales.

== Results ==
23 November

Wales	41–7	France

Stebonheath Park, Llanelli
Attendance: 25,000

1 February

England	14–17	Wales

Craven Park, Hull
Attendance: 20,000

16 February

France	7–25	England

Stade Buffalo, Paris
Attendance: 25,000

=== Final standings ===
Team	Played	Won	Drew	Lost	For	Against	Diff	Points
Wales	2	2	0	0	58	21	+37	4
England	2	1	0	1	39	24	+15	2
France	2	0	0	2	14	66	-52	0
