= 1947–48 European Rugby League Championship =

1947–48 European Championship
- Number of teams: 3
- Winner: England (4th title)
- Matches played: 6

This was the eighth European Championship and was won for the fourth time by England.

== Results ==
20 September

England	10 – 8	Wales

Central Park, Wigan
Attendance: 27,000

25 October

England	20 – 15	France

Fartown Ground, Huddersfield
Attendance: 14,175

23 November

France	29 – 21	Wales

Stade du Parc Lescure, Bordeaux
Attendance: 27,000

6 December

Wales	7-18	England

St Helens Rugby Ground, Swansea
Attendance: 10,000

20 March

Wales	20 – 12	France

St Helens Rugby Ground, Swansea
Attendance: 6,462

11 April

France	25–10	England

Stade Vélodrome, Marseille
Attendance: 32,000

=== Final standings ===
Team	Played	Won	Drew	Lost	For	Against	Diff	Points
England	4	3	0	1	71	42	+29	6
France	4	2	0	2	74	78	−4	4
Wales	4	1	0	3	50	75	−25	2
