= 1977 European Rugby League Championship =

1977 European Championship
- Number of teams: 3
- Winner: France (5th title)
- Matches played: 3

The 1977 European Rugby League Championship was the 18th edition of the Rugby League European Championship, a rugby league tournament that took place in Europe.

France won the competition after winning both of their matches.

== Results ==
29 January

England	2 – 6	Wales

Headingley, Leeds
Attendance: 6,472

20 February

France	13 – 2	Wales

Stade des Minimes, Toulouse
Attendance: 5,827

20 March

France	28 – 15	England

Stade d'Albert Domec, Carcassonne
Attendance: 12,000

=== Final standings ===
Team	Played	Won	Drew	Lost	For	Against	Diff	Points
France	2	2	0	0	41	17	+24	4
Wales	2	1	0	1	8	15	−7	2
England	2	0	0	2	17	34	−17	0

- France win the tournament with two victories.
