= 1996 European Rugby League Championship =

1996 European Championship
- Number of teams: 3
- Winner: England (12th title)
- Matches played: 3

The 1996 European Rugby League Championship was the second and last championship of the 1990s. After England won the tournament, it was not played again until 2003.

== Game 1 ==
5 June

France	14 – 34	Wales
Tries: Arnaud Cervello (2); Gael Tallec Goals: Patrick Torreilles (1)	report	Tries: Iestyn Harris (3); Phil Atcheson; Richard Webster; Jonathan Davies; Goals: Iestyn Harris (5)

Stade d'Albert Domec, Carcassonne
Attendance: 4,300
Referee: Russell Smith (England)

== Game 2 ==
12 June

England	73 – 6	France
Tries: Martin Offiah (4); Gary Connolly (3); Paul Newlove (2); Steve Prescott (2); Steve Blakeley; Jason Robinson; Paul Sculthorpe; Goals: Steve Prescott (7); Steve McNamara (1); Field Goals: Martin Offiah (1)	report	Try: Eric Van Brussel Goal: Patrick Torreilles (1)

Gateshead International Stadium, Gateshead
Attendance: 6,239
Referee: Bill Harrigan (Australia)

== Game 3 ==
26 June

Wales	12 – 26	England
Tries: Chris Morley; Jason Critchley Goals: Iestyn Harris (2)	report	Tries: Chris Joynt; Bobbie Goulding; Shaun Edwards; Steve Prescott; Goals: Bobbie Goulding (5)

Cardiff Arms Park, Cardiff
Attendance: 5,245
Referee: Bill Harrigan (Australia)

== Final standings ==
Team	Played	Won	Drew	Lost	For	Against	Diff	Points
England	2	2	0	0	99	18	+81	4
Wales	2	1	0	1	46	40	+6	2
France	2	0	0	2	20	107	−87	0
