= 1945–46 European Rugby League Championship =

1945–46 European Championship
- Number of teams: 3
- Winner: England (2nd title)
- Matches played: 3

This was the fifth European Championship and was won by England on points average. It was their second championship title.

== Results ==
24 November

Wales	11 – 3	England

St Helens Rugby Ground, Swansea
Attendance: 30,000

23 February

England	16 – 6	France

Station Road, Swinton
Attendance: 20,500

24 March

France	19 – 7	Wales

Stade du Parc Lescure, Bordeaux
Attendance: 25,000

== Final standings ==
Team	Played	Won	Drew	Lost	For	Against	Diff	Points
England	2	1	0	1	19	17	+2	2
France	2	1	0	1	25	23	+2	2
Wales	2	1	0	1	18	22	−4	2
