= 1969–70 European Rugby League Championship =

1969–70 European Championship
- Number of teams: 3
- Winner: England (7th title)
- Matches played: 6

This was the sixteenth European Championship and was won for the seventh time by England after a gap of thirteen years.

== Results ==
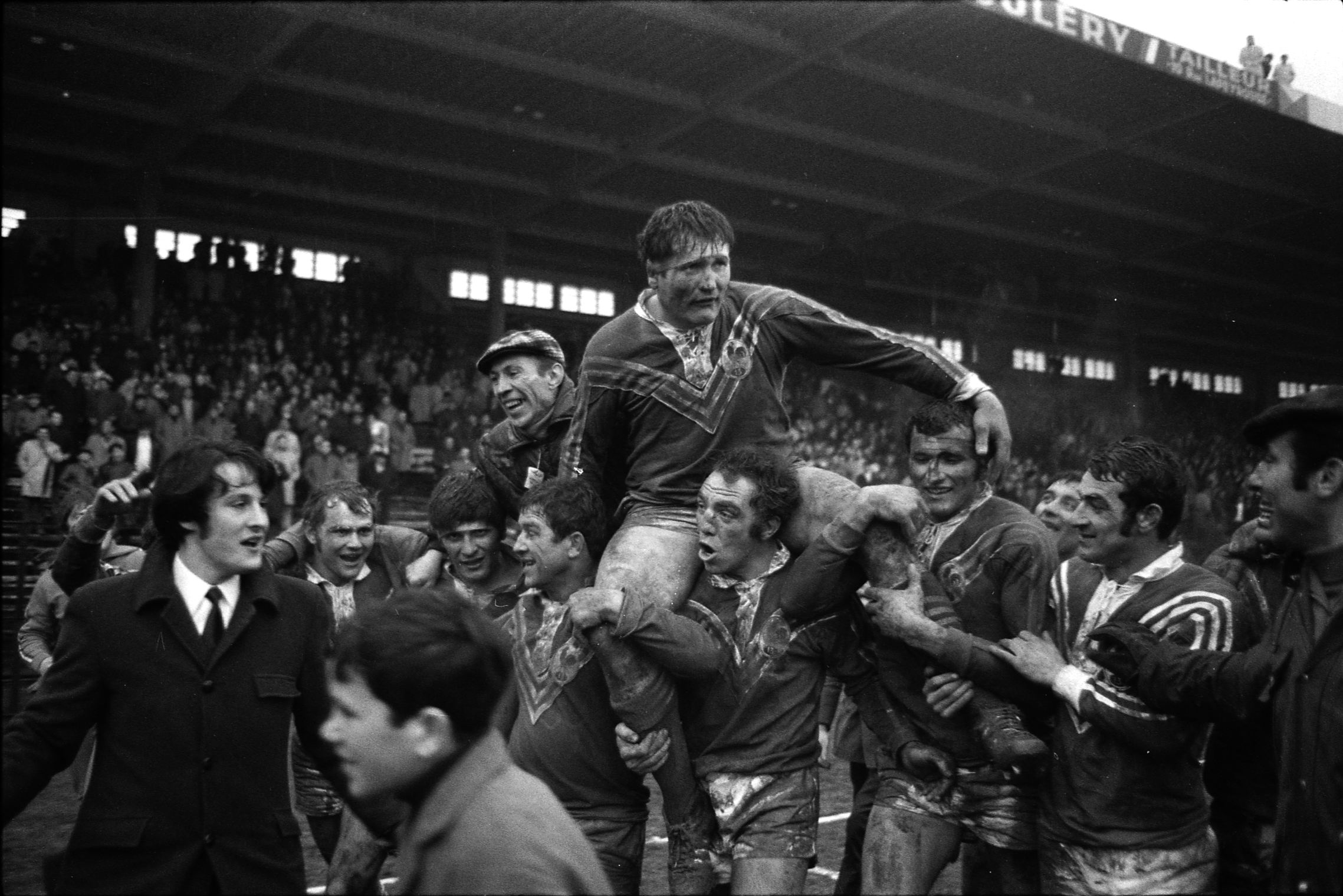
The French captain, Georges Ailleres, carried on his teammates' shoulders after a win against England.

18 October

England	40 – 23	Wales

Headingley, Leeds
Attendance: 8,355

23 October

Wales	8–2	France

The Willows, Salford
Attendance: 6,189

25 October

England	11 – 11	France

Central Park, Wigan
Attendance: 4,568

25 January

France	15 – 11	Wales

Stade Gilbert Brutus, Perpignan
Attendance: 11,000

24 February

England	26 – 7	Wales

Headingley, Leeds
Attendance: 9,393

15 March

France	14 – 9	England

Stade des Minimes, Toulouse
Attendance: 6,587

=== Final standings ===
Team	Played	Won	Drew	Lost	For	Against	Diff	Points
England	4	2	1	1	86	55	+31	5
France	4	2	1	1	44	37	+7	5
Wales	4	1	0	3	47	85	−38	2

- England win the tournament on points difference.
