= 1949–50 European Rugby League Championship =

1949–50 European Championship
- Number of teams: 4
- Winner: England (5th title)
- Matches played: 6

This was the tenth European Championship and was won for the fifth time by England on Points Average. This tournament saw the introduction of the Other Nationalities team, which was made up of players from Scotland and the southern hemisphere who played in the NRFU. The tournament also reverted to the single game round robin format.

== Results ==
19 September

England	7 - 13	Other nationalities

Borough Park, Workington
Attendance: 17,500

22 October

Wales	5 - 6	Other nationalities

The Park, Abertillery
Attendance: 2,000

12 November

Wales	16–8	France

St Helens Rugby Ground, Swansea
Attendance: 4,749

4 December

France	5 – 13	England

Stade du Parc Lescure, Bordeaux
Attendance: 20,598

15 January

France	8 – 3	Other nationalities

Stade Vélodrome, Marseille
Attendance: 30,000

1 March

England	11 – 6	Wales

Central Park, Wigan
Attendance: 27,500

=== Final standings ===
Team	Played	Won	Drew	Lost	For	Against	Diff	Points
England	3	2	0	1	31	24	+7	4
Other nationalities	3	2	0	1	22	20	+2	4
Wales	3	1	0	2	27	25	+2	2
France	3	1	0	2	21	32	−11	2
