= 1938–39 European Rugby League Championship =

1938–39 European Championship
- Number of teams: 3
- Winner: France (1st title)
- Matches played: 3

This was the fifth European Championship and was won by France for the first time.

== Results ==
5 November

Wales	17 – 9	England

Stebonheath Park, Llanelli
Attendance: 15,000

25 February

England	9 – 12	France

Knowsley Road, St. Helens
Attendance: 8,557

16 April

France	16 – 10	Wales

Stade Chaban-Delmas, Bordeaux
Attendance: 25,000

=== Final standings ===
Team	Played	Won	Drew	Lost	For	Against	Diff	Points
France	2	2	0	0	28	19	+9	4
Wales	2	1	0	1	27	25	+2	2
England	2	0	0	2	18	29	−11	0
