= 2003 European Nations Cup =

- Number of teams: 6
- Winner: England (13th title)
- Matches played: 7

The European Nations Cup returned in 2003, being the first tournament since England last won it in 1996. The last European Nations Cup held, in 1996, followed traditional structures presented from previous tournaments, involving just three nations, England, France and Wales, all teams only playing each other once.

The 2003 tournament saw a revised structure, with Ireland, Scotland and Russia all joining. The new structure formed the basis of two groups of three, each nation playing a total of two games, where the winner of each group meets in a final.

Pre-tournament favourites England easily won the final against France.

== Group 1 ==
=== Results ===
26 October

Scotland	22 – 24	Ireland

Old Anniesland, Glasgow
Attendance: 1,123
Referee: Thierry Alibert (France)

1 November

Ireland	18 – 26	France

Dalymount Park, Dublin
Attendance: 1,082
Referee: Richard Silverwood (England)

9 November

France	6 – 8	Scotland

Parc des Sports, Avignon
Attendance: 2,200
Referee: Richard Silverwood (England)

=== Final standings ===
Team	Played	Won	Drew	Lost	For	Against	Diff	Points
France	2	1	0	1	32	26	+6	2
Scotland	2	1	0	1	30	30	0	2
Ireland	2	1	0	1	42	48	−6	2

France advanced to the final on points differential.

== Group 2 ==
=== Results ===
26 October

Wales	74 – 4	Russia

Talbot Athletic Ground, Port Talbot
Attendance: 1,082
Referee: Glen Black (New Zealand)

2 November

England	102 – 0	Russia

Odsal Stadium, Bradford
Attendance: 1,376
Referee: Richard Silverwood (England)

9 November

England	22 – 4	Wales

Headingley, Leeds
Attendance: 2,124
Referee: Thierry Alibert (France)

=== Final standings ===
Team	Played	Won	Drew	Lost	For	Against	Diff	Points
England	2	2	0	0	124	4	+120	4
Wales	2	1	0	1	78	26	+52	2
Russia	2	0	0	2	4	176	−172	0

England advanced to the final.

== Final ==
16 November

England	68 – 6	France
Tries: Mark Calderwood (4); Rob Burrow (2); Gareth Hock; Martin Aspinwall; Ade Gardner; Andy Lynch; Rob Parker; Goals: Danny Tickle (9); Jamie Rooney (1)	report	Tries: Teddy Sadaoui Goals: Laurent Frayssinous (1)

Wilderspool Stadium, Warrington
Attendance: 2,536
Referee: Karl Kirkpatrick (England)
