= 1936–37 European Rugby League Championship =

1936–37 European Championship
- Number of teams: 3
- Winner: Wales (2nd title)
- Matches played: 3

This was the third European Championship and was won for the second consecutive time by Wales.

== Results ==
7 November

Wales	3 – 2	England

Taff Vale Park, Pontypridd
Attendance: 12,000

6 December

France	3 – 9	Wales

Stade Buffalo, Paris
Attendance: 17,000

10 April

England	23 – 9	France

Thrum Hall, Halifax
Attendance: 7,024

=== Final standings ===
Team	Played	Won	Drew	Lost	For	Against	Diff	Points
Wales	2	2	0	0	12	5	+7	4
England	2	1	0	1	25	12	+13	2
France	2	0	0	2	12	32	−20	0
