= 1978 European Rugby League Championship =

1978 European Championship
- Number of teams: 3
- Winner: England (9th title)
- Matches played: 3

The 1978 European Rugby League Championship was the 19th edition of the Rugby League European Championship, a rugby league tournament that took place in Europe.

England won the competition after defeating Wales 60–13, which was at the time Wales' largest margin of defeat.

== Results ==
15 January

Wales	29 – 7	France

Naughton Park, Widnes
Attendance: 9,502

France	11 – 13	England

Stade des Minimes, Toulouse
Attendance: 6,000

28 May

England	60 – 13	Wales

Knowsley Road, St Helens
Attendance: 9,759

=== Final standings ===
Team	Played	Won	Drew	Lost	For	Against	Diff	Points
England	2	2	0	0	73	24	+49	4
Wales	2	1	0	1	42	67	−25	2
France	2	0	0	2	18	42	−24	0

- England win the tournament with two victories.
