= 1938 European Rugby League Championship =

1938 European Championship
- Number of teams: 3
- Winner: Wales (3rd title)
- Matches played: 3

This was the fourth European Championship and was won by Wales for the third time in a row. The tri-nation tournament was played between January and April 1938 as a single round robin game between England, France and Wales.

== Results ==
=== England vs Wales ===
29 January

England	6–7	Wales

Odsal Stadium, Bradford
Attendance: 8,637

=== France vs England ===
20 March

France	15–17	England

Stade Buffalo, Paris
Attendance: 17,000

=== Wales vs France ===
2 April

Wales	18–2	France

Stebonheath Park, Llanelli
Attendance: 17,000

== Final standings ==
Team	Played	Won	Drew	Lost	For	Against	Diff	Points
Wales	2	2	0	0	25	8	+17	4
England	2	1	0	1	23	22	+1	2
France	2	0	0	2	17	35	−18	0
