= 1975 European Rugby League Championship =

1975 European Championship
- Number of teams: 3
- Winner: England (8th title)
- Matches played: 3

The revived 1975 European Rugby League Championship used traditional structures that saw a return to the one-game format. It was also known as the International Triangular Tournament, involving only three nations: England, France, and Wales. This was the seventeenth competition and was won for the eighth time by England.

== Results ==
19 January

France	9 – 11	England

Stade Gilbert Brutus, Perpignan
Attendance: 7,950

16 February

Wales	21 – 8	France

St Helens Rugby Ground, Swansea
Attendance: 23,000

25 February

England	12 – 8	Wales

The Willows, Salford
Attendance: 8,494

=== Final standings ===
Team	Played	Won	Drew	Lost	For	Against	Diff	Points
England	2	2	0	0	23	17	+6	4
Wales	2	1	0	1	29	20	+9	2
France	2	0	0	2	17	32	−15	0

- England won the tournament with two victories.
