= Stade Toulousain in Cup Finals =

This article contains the record of Stade Toulousain rugby union club in championship and cup finals.

== French championship ==
Key
†	Match was won during extra time

Date	Winners	Score	Runners-up	Venue	Spectators
26 April 1903	Stade Français	16–8	SOE Toulouse	Prairie des Filtres, Toulouse	5,000
4 April 1909	Stade Bordelais UC	17–0	Stade Toulousain	Stade des Ponts Jumeaux, Toulouse	15,000
31 March 1912	Stade Toulousain	8–6	Racing Club de France	Stade des Ponts Jumeaux, Toulouse	15,000
17 April 1921	US Perpignan	5–0	Stade Toulousain	Parc des Sports de Sauclières, Béziers	20,000
23 April 1922	Stade Toulousain	6–0	Aviron Bayonnais	Route du Médoc, Le Bouscat	20,000
13 May 1923	Stade Toulousain	3–0	Aviron Bayonnais	Stade Yves-du-Manoir, Colombes	15,000
27 April 1924	Stade Toulousain	3–0	US Perpignan	Parc Lescure, Bordeaux	20,000
2 May 1926	Stade Toulousain	11–0	US Perpignan	Parc Lescure, Bordeaux	25,000
29 May 1927	Stade Toulousain	19–9	Stade Français	Stade des Ponts Jumeaux, Toulouse	20,000
13 April 1947	Stade Toulousain	10–3	SU Agen	Stade des Ponts Jumeaux, Toulouse	25,000
18 May 1969	CA Bègles	11–9	Stade Toulousain	Stade de Gerland, Lyon	22,191
25 May 1980	AS Béziers	10–6	Stade Toulousain	Parc des Princes, Paris	43,350
25 May 1985	Stade Toulousain	36–22	RC Toulon	Parc des Princes, Paris	37,000
24 May 1986	Stade Toulousain	16–6	SU Agen	Parc des Princes, Paris	45,145
27 May 1989	Stade Toulousain	18–12	RC Toulon	Parc des Princes, Paris	48,000
1 June 1991	CA Bègles	19–10	Stade Toulousain	Parc des Princes, Paris	48,000
28 May 1994	Stade Toulousain	22–16	AS Montferrand	Parc des Princes, Paris	48,000
6 May 1995	Stade Toulousain	31–16	Castres Olympique	Parc des Princes, Paris	48,615
1 June 1996	Stade Toulousain	20–13	CA Brive	Parc des Princes, Paris	48,162
31 May 1997	Stade Toulousain	12–6	CS Bourgoin	Parc des Princes, Paris	44,000
29 May 1999	Stade Toulousain	15–11	AS Montferrand	Stade de France, Saint-Denis	78,000
9 June 2001	Stade Toulousain	34–22	AS Montferrand	Stade de France, Saint-Denis	78,000
7 June 2003	Stade Français	32–18	Stade Toulousain	Stade de France, Saint-Denis	78,000
7 June 2006	Biarritz Olympique	40–13	Stade Toulousain	Stade de France, Saint-Denis	78,000
28 June 2008	Stade Toulousain	26–20	ASM Clermont Auvergne	Stade de France, Saint-Denis	79,124
4 June 2011	Stade Toulousain	15–10	Montpellier	Stade de France, Saint-Denis	77,000
9 June 2012	Stade Toulousain	18–12	RC Toulon	Stade de France, Saint-Denis	77,560
15 June 2019	Stade Toulousain	24–18	ASM Clermont Auvergne	Stade de France, Saint-Denis	79,786
25 June 2021	Stade Toulousain	18–8	Stade Rochelais	Stade de France, Saint-Denis	14,000
17 June 2023	Stade Toulousain	29–26	Stade Rochelais	Stade de France, Saint-Denis	79,804
28 June 2024	Stade Toulousain	59–3	Union Bordeaux Bègles	Stade de Velodrome, Marseille	66,760
28 June 2025	Stade Toulousain	39–33 †	Union Bordeaux Bègles	Stade de France, Saint-Denis	78,534

== Heineken Cup and European Rugby Champions Cup ==
Key
†	Match was won during extra time

Date	Winners	Score	Runners-up	Venue	Spectators
7 January 1996	(France) Stade Toulousain	21–18	(Wales) Cardiff	Arms Park, Cardiff	21,800
24 May 2003	(France) Stade Toulousain	22–17	(France) Perpignan	Lansdowne Road, Dublin	28,600
23 May 2004	(England) London Wasps	27–20	(France) Stade Toulousain	Twickenham, London	73,057
22 May 2005	(France) Stade Toulousain	18–12 †	(France) Stade Français	Murrayfield, Edinburgh	51,326
24 May 2008	(Ireland) Munster	16–13	(France) Stade Toulousain	Millennium, Cardiff	74,417
22 May 2010	(France) Stade Toulousain	21–19	(France) Biarritz	Stade de France, Saint-Denis	78,962
22 May 2021	(France) Stade Toulousain	22–17	(France) Stade Rochelais	Twickenham, London	10,000
25 May 2024	(France) Stade Toulousain	31–22	(Ireland) Leinster	Tottenham Hotspur Stadium, London	61,531
