= 1938–39 French Rugby Union Championship =

- Countries: France
- Champions: Biarritz
- Runners-up: USA Perpignan

The 1938–39 French Rugby Union Championship of first division was won by Biarritz that beat the Perpignan in the final. Biarritz olympique took his revenge of the previous year when was defeated by Perpignan in the final.

The tournament was played by 42 clubs divided in six pool of seven. The better eight were qualified for the quarters of finals

== Context ==
The 1938 International Championship was won by Wales, the France was excluded

== Semifinals ==
apr. 1939	Perpignan	-	Agen	14 – 6 o.t.
apr. 1938	Biarritz	-	Toulon	7 - 0

== Final ==
Teams	Biarritz - Perpignan
Score	6-0 (after overtime)
Date	30 April 1939
Venue	Stade des Ponts Jumeaux, Toulouse
Referee	Paul Bergès
Line-up
Biarritz	Francis Daguerre, André Henon, Alfred Guiné, Auguste Lassalle, Etienne Ithurra, Fernand Muniain, Louis Lascaray, Jean Leguay, Roger Boubé, Henri Haget, Pierre Pastor, Gabriel Haget, Louis Hatchondo, Henri Sorondo, Rémi Sallenave
Perpignan	Jean Calvet, Camille Monceau, Sauveur Moly, Marcel Llary, Joseph Henric, Henri Gras, Lucien Boulé, Jacques Palat, André Abat, Gilbert Lavail, Joseph Pagès, Noël Brazès, Hubert Marty, Frédéric Trescazes, Paul Porical
Scorers
Biarritz	2 tries Sorondo
Perpignan
