= Brazès =

Brazès is a surname. Notable people with the surname include:

- Edmond Brazès (1893–1980), French writer
- Noël Brazès (1920–2010), French rugby union player

== See also ==
- Brazing
