= 1937–38 French Rugby Union Championship =

Rugby union championship

- Countries: France
- Champions: USA Perpignan
- Runners-up: Biarritz

The 1937–38 French Rugby Union Championship was won by Perpignan that beat Biarritz in the final.

The tournament was played by 40 clubs divided in eight pools of five clubs. At the second round were admitted the first two of each pool.

== Context ==
The 1938 International Championship was won by Scotland, the France was excluded.

France won the third FIRA Tournament in Bucharest.

== Semifinals ==
apr. 1938	Perpignan	-	SBUC	8 - 3
apr. 1938	Biarritz	-	Montferrand	3 - 0

== Final ==
Teams	Perpignan - Biarritz
Score	11-6
Date	8 May 1938
Venue	Stade des Ponts Jumeaux, Toulouse
Referee	Léopold Mailhan
Line-up
Perpignan	Sauveur Moly, Louis Montagné, André Poncy, Marcel Llary, Egalité Casenove, Henri Gras, Lucien Ballini, Jacques Palat, Roger Vaills, Gilbert Lavail, André Abat, Noël Brazès, Joseph Desclaux, Jean Serre, Paul Porical
Biarritz	Francis Daguerre, André Henon, Alfred Guiné, Jean-Baptiste Lefort, Etienne Ithurra, Louis Lascaray, Gabriel Boutayre, Henri Leguay, Raoul Gascon, Henri Haget, Claude Paquin, Gabriel Haget, Jacques Arrizabalaga, Jean Galey, Rémi Sallenave
Scorers
Perpignan	3 tries Brazès (2), Casenove; 1 conversion de Desclaux
Biarritz	1 try Sallenave, 1 penalty de Boutayre
