= USA Perpignan =

French rugby union club

(France) USA Perpignan
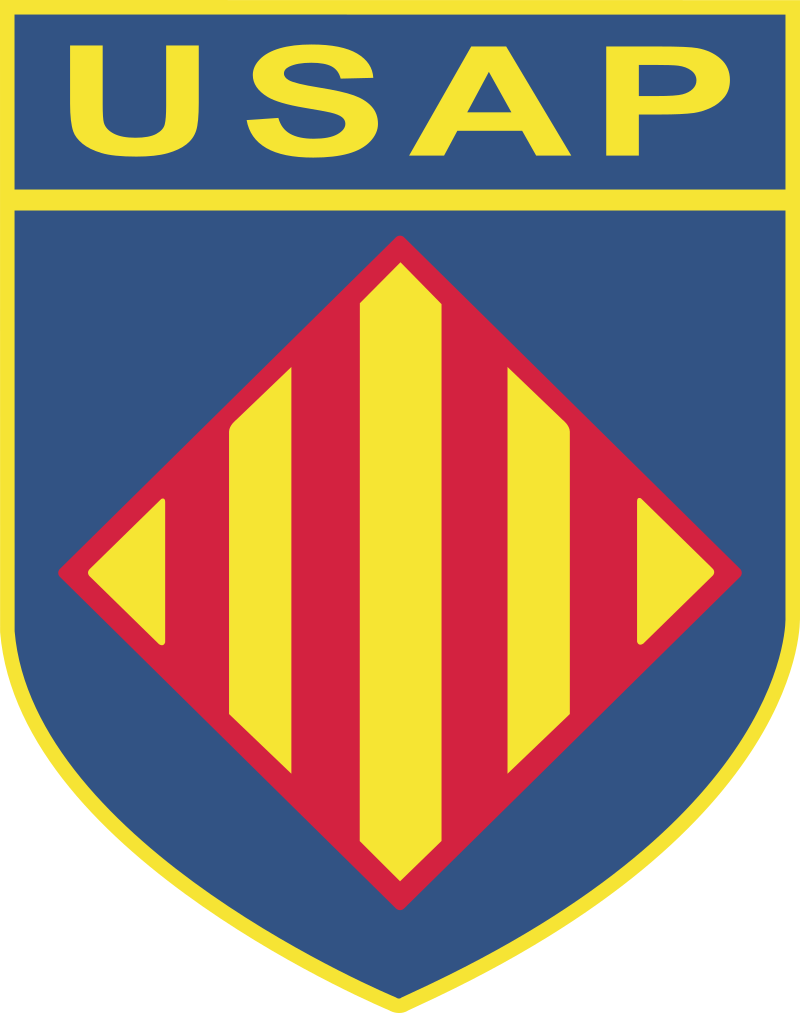
- Full name: Union sportive arlequins Perpignan-Roussillon
- Founded: 1902; 124 years ago (as AS Perpignan); 1919; 107 years ago (as US Perpignan); 1933; 93 years ago (as USA Perpignan)
- Location: Perpignan, France
- Ground: Stade Aimé Giral (Capacity: 14,593)
- President: François Rivière
- Coach: Laurent Labit
- Captain: Jerónimo de la Fuente
- League: Top 14
- 2024–25: 13th
Team kit	2nd kit

Official website
- www.usap.fr

Union Sportive Arlequins Perpignanais, also referred to as USA Perpignan or Perpignan, is a French professional rugby union club founded in 1933 and based in Perpignan, in the Pyrénées-Orientales department. They compete in the Top 14, France's elite division of rugby.

The club is a result of a merger between US Perpignan and Arlequins Perpignanais in 1933. US Perpignan was also born from a 1919 union of merging clubs AS Perpignan (founded in 1902) and Stade Olympien Perpignanais.

Its home ground is the 14,593-capacity Stade Aimé Giral but important fixtures may occasionally be taken to Estadi Olímpic Lluís Companys, in Barcelona. The club's colours are sky blue, scarlet and golden yellow, which derived from the Catalan Senyera and give Perpignan its nickname Les Sang et Or (French for "The Blood and Golds").

== History ==
=== Early years ===
One of the two merging clubs was established in 1902 as AS Perpignan. It would be in 1914 that the club would go on to make its first ever final appearance. On 3 May, Perpignan defeated Stadoceste Tarbais 8–7 at Stade des Ponts Jumeaux in Toulouse in front of 15,000 people. 19-year-old fly-half Aimé Giral converted a late try and went on to become captain. 14 months after their victory, Aimé Giral died alongside seven other members of the team at the outbreak of WW1 and, to honour their sacrifice, it was decided to colour USAP jersey like a Poilu uniform and to name the stadium after Giral.

Four years after the championship in 1914, the club was renamed as US Perpignan after a merging with Stade Olympien Perpignanais. Under the new club name, US Perpignan made it to the final of the French championship three seasons after the change. On 17 April 1921, Perpignan defeated Stade Toulousain 5–0 at Parc des Sports de Sauclières in Béziers and thus claiming their second championship. Three seasons later, the finalists of 1921 would meet again in the final of 1924, though this time Toulouse won the game 3–0 in Bordeaux.

The success continued throughout the 1920s, and following the final defeat of the 1924 season, US Perpignan were able to make it to the final of the 1925 season. They faced US Carcassonne in Narbonne, and defeated them 5–0 to win the 1925 Championship. For the third season in a row, US Perpignan made it to the final. The opponents were Stade Toulousain once again, the two sides had each defeated each other once in a final in recent years. Toulouse won 11–0 in Bordeaux. After their prominence in the mid-1920s, Perpignan's final appearance in 1926 was their last for nearly a decade.

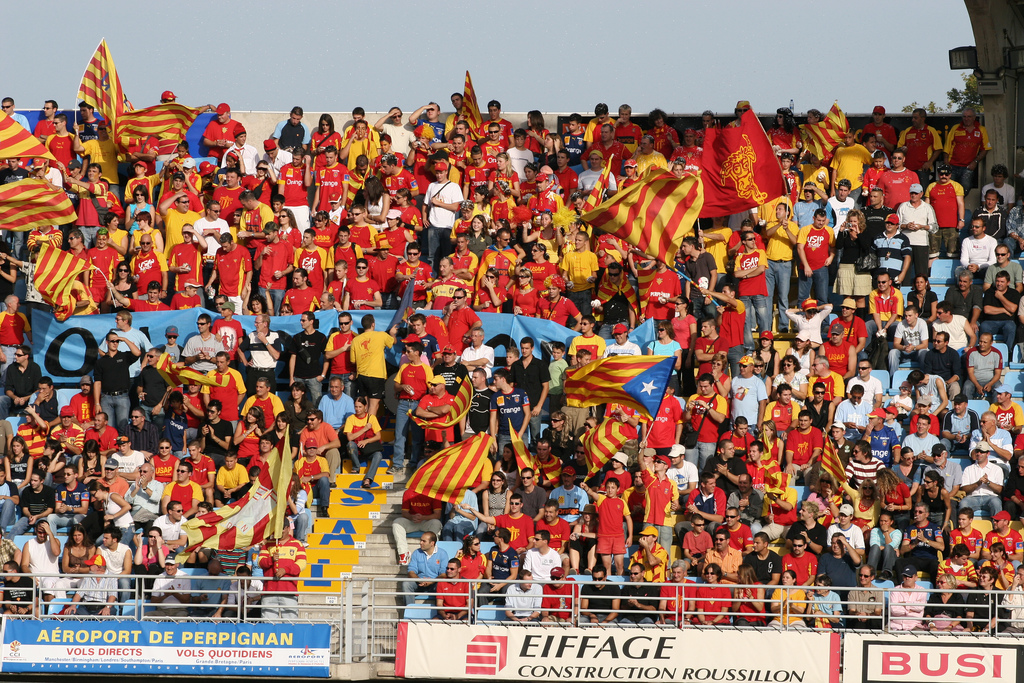
Perpignan fans at a home game

Perpignan's next final appearance came in 1935 against Biarritz at Stade des Ponts Jumeaux in Toulouse on 12 May, with Biarritz winning 3–0. That season they also won the Challenge Yves du Manoir. Three seasons later Perpignan were again involved in the Championship final against Biarritz. The final was played on 8 May, and this time, Perpignan defeated Biarritz, winning 11–6 to claim their first Championship since 1921. They were also runners-up of the Challenge Yves-du-Manoir that same season as well.

The success continued throughout the late 1930s, with Perpignan again being runners-up of the Challenge Yves du Manoir in 1936. It was also the 1936 season that Biarritz and Perpignan would face off in the Championship. Both of Perpignan's last two final appearances were against Biarritz, and both Perpignan and Biarritz had won one each against each other. The final took place on 30 April, and Biarritz turned out to be victorious, defeating Perpignan 6–0. Two years later, Perpignan were in the final of the Challenge Yves du Manoir, but became runners-up.

Their next final appearance would not be until the season of 1944. Perpignan played Aviron Bayonnais at Parc des Princes in Paris on 26 March to decide who would be the champions of France. Perpignan won, defeating Aviron Bayonnais 20–5, claiming their first Championship since 1938.

Perpignan would have to wait another eight years until they would make it to the final again. In the 1952 season, Perpignan met FC Lourdes in the final at Stadium Municipal in Toulouse, where they went down to FC Lourdes 20–11. However, both sides would meet in another final three years later to decide the 1955 Championship. This time Perpignan emerged victorious, defeating FC Lourdes 11–6 in Bordeaux. Perpignan also won the Challenge Yves du Manoir during the 1955 season, and were runners-us the following year as well.

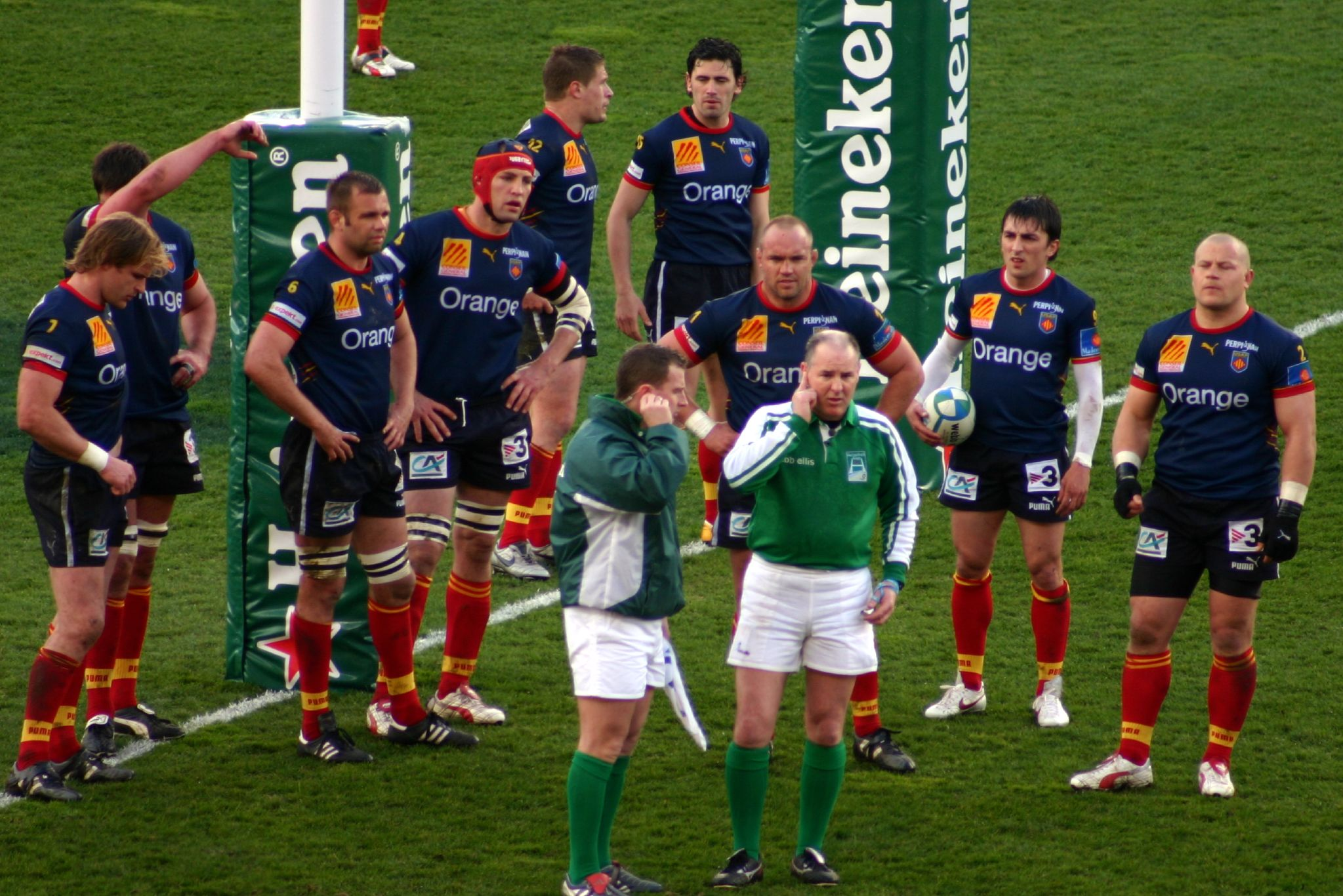
USA Perpignan during a Heineken Cup match

Perpignan won the Challenge Yves du Manoir in 1965, but made their first final appearance 20 years after 1955, to decide the 1977 season Championship. They met AS Béziers in the final, who defeated Perpignan 12–4 at Parc des Princes. Perpignan won the Challenge Yves du Manoir in 1994,

=== Professional era ===
They would next appear in the final in 1998, where they went down to Stade Français Paris 34–7 in Paris in front of 78,000 people.

In 2002, the club entered into a partnership with the University of Barcelona Rugby Union Club, hence renaming them USAP Barcelona, which compete in the División de Honor, the national Championship in Spain. Perpignan made it to the 2004 final, where they met Stade Français, who defeated them in the 1998 final. Stade Français won again, 38–20 at Stade de France in front of 79,722 people.

In European competition, Perpignan reached the final stage in 2003 (losing 21–17 to Toulouse in Dublin Lansdowne Road) after losing a 1999 semi-final in Toulouse Stadium against Colomiers. They were beaten in the quarter-finals in Lansdowne Road again in 2006 by eventual winners Munster.

They signed All Blacks fly-half Dan Carter, widely regarded as one of the world's best players, on a six-month deal starting from December 2008. Carter's stint at Perpignan, however, ended prematurely when he tore an Achilles tendon.

Their season ended by progressing into the Top 14 semi-final with a 25–21 win over Stade Français Paris and eventually winning it with a fantastic 22–13 win over ASM Clermont Auvergne in the final. In 2010, they advanced to the final again against Clermont, but they saw Les Jaunards end decades of frustration by winning their first championship final in 11 tries.

In 2011 they signed a twinning agreement with FC Barcelona of Spain, which proposes USAP to be promoted through FC Barcelona.

== Club honours ==
- French championship Top 14
  - Champions (4): 1938, 1944, 1955, 2009
  - Runners-up (7): 1935, 1939, 1952, 1977, 1998, 2004, 2010
- Heineken Cup / European Rugby Champions Cup
  - Runners-up (1): 2003
- Challenge Yves du Manoir
  - Champions (3): 1935, 1955, 1994
  - Runners-up (5): 1936, 1937, 1938, 1956, 1965
- Pro D2
  - Champions (2): 2018, 2021

== Finals results ==
=== French championship ===
Date	Winners	Score	Runners-up	Venue	Spectators
12 May 1935	Biarritz Olympique	3–0	USA Perpignan	Stade des Ponts Jumeaux, Toulouse	23,000
8 May 1938	USA Perpignan	11–6	Biarritz Olympique	Stade des Ponts Jumeaux, Toulouse	24,600
30 April 1939	Biarritz Olympique	6–0 AP	USA Perpignan	Stade des Ponts Jumeaux, Toulouse	23,000
26 March 1944	USA Perpignan	20–5	Aviron Bayonnais	Parc des Princes, Paris	35,000
4 May 1952	FC Lourdes	20–11	USA Perpignan	Stadium Municipal, Toulouse	32,500
22 May 1955	USA Perpignan	11–6	FC Lourdes	Parc Lescure, Bordeaux	39,764
29 May 1977	AS Béziers	12–4	USA Perpignan	Parc des Princes, Paris	41,821
16 May 1998	Stade Français Paris	34–7	USA Perpignan	Stade de France, Saint-Denis	78,000
26 June 2004	Stade Français Paris	38–20	USA Perpignan	Stade de France, Saint-Denis	79,722
6 June 2009	USA Perpignan	22–13	ASM Clermont	Stade de France, Saint-Denis	79,205
29 May 2010	ASM Clermont	19–6	USA Perpignan	Stade de France, Saint-Denis	79,262

=== Heineken Cup / European Rugby Champions Cup ===
Date	Winners	Score	Runners-up	Venue	Spectators
24 May 2003	Stade Toulousain	22–17	USA Perpignan	Lansdowne Road, Dublin	28,600

=== Challenge Yves du Manoir ===
Date	Winners	Score	Runners-up
1935	USA Perpignan	3–3, 6–0	AS Montferrand
1936	Aviron Bayonnais	9–3	USA Perpignan
1937	Biarritz olympique	3–0	USA Perpignan
1938	AS Montferrand	23–10	USA Perpignan
1955	USA Perpignan	22–11	SC Mazamet
1956	FC Lourdes	3–0	USA Perpignan
1965	US Cognac	5–3	USA Perpignan
1994	USA Perpignan	18–3	AS Montferrand

== Current standings ==
2025–26 Top 14 Table
Pos	Team	Pld	W	D	L	PF	PA	PD	TF	TA	TB	LB	Pts	Qualification
1	Toulouse	26	18	0	8	981	617	+364	134	73	13	3	86 (Note: Toulouse received a two-point deduction due to irregularities around the transfer of their former player Melvyn Jaminet)	Qualification for playoff semi-finals and European Rugby Champions Cup
2	Montpellier	26	17	1	8	824	587	+237	101	69	8	4	82	Qualification for playoff semi-finals and European Rugby Champions Cup
3	Stade Français	26	15	1	10	869	664	+205	113	83	11	6	79	Qualification for playoff semi-final qualifiers and European Rugby Champions Cup
4	Pau	26	17	0	9	817	665	+152	98	82	7	3	78	Qualification for playoff semi-final qualifiers and European Rugby Champions Cup
5	Racing 92	26	16	1	9	828	723	+105	101	91	6	2	74	Qualification for playoff semi-final qualifiers and European Rugby Champions Cup
6	La Rochelle	26	15	0	11	824	634	+190	106	73	8	4	72	Qualification for playoff semi-final qualifiers and European Rugby Champions Cup
7	Clermont	26	15	0	11	812	708	+104	103	87	8	3	71	Qualification for European Rugby Champions Cup
8	Bordeaux Bègles	26	14	0	12	822	719	+103	113	90	8	6	70	Qualification for European Rugby Champions Cup
9	Toulon	26	12	1	13	714	820	−106	96	103	8	1	59	Qualification for European Rugby Challenge Cup
10	Castres	26	11	0	15	660	751	−91	81	96	3	8	55	Qualification for European Rugby Challenge Cup
11	Lyon	26	11	1	14	734	774	−40	92	101	3	3	52	Qualification for European Rugby Challenge Cup
12	Bayonne	26	11	0	15	747	869	−122	94	113	4	3	51	Qualification for European Rugby Challenge Cup
13	Perpignan	26	6	0	20	550	797	−247	64	99	1	4	29	Qualification for relegation play-off
14	Montauban	26	1	1	24	495	1349	−854	61	197	0	1	7	Relegation to Pro D2

Updated to match(es) played on 17 May 2026. Source: Top 14

== Current squad ==
The Perpignan squad for the 2026–27 season is:

USA Perpignan 2026–27 Top 14 squad
**Props**: (Samoa) **Brad Amituanai**; (France) Lorencio Boyer Gallardo; (Italy) **Pietro Ceccarelli**; (France) Bruce Devaux; (France) **Enzo Forletta**; (France) **Cedate Gomes Sa**; (Italy) **Marco Riccioni**; (Georgia (country)) **Giorgi Tetrashvili**; **Hookers**: (France) Mathys Lotrian; (Samoa) **Sama Malolo**; (France) Victor Montgaillard; (Argentina) **Ignacio Ruiz**; **Locks**: (France) Bastien Chinarro; (Scotland) **Jonny Gray**; (France) Mathieu Tanguy; (France) **Posolo Tuilagi**; (France) Adrien Warion; (Fiji) **Peceli Yato**	**Back row**: (France) Jules Coulon; (France) Noé Della Schiava; (Georgia (country)) **Andro Dvali**; (France) Mattéo Le Corvec; (Portugal) **José Madeira**; (Argentina) **Joaquín Oviedo**; (France) Patrick Sobela; (Australia) **Lachlan Swinton**; (France) **Jacobus van Tonder**; (France) Lucas Velarte; **Scrum-halves**: (France) Tom Ecochard; (South Africa) James Hall; (Ireland) **Luke McGrath**; **Fly-halves**: (Italy) **Paolo Garbisi**; (Australia) Jack McIntyre; (Argentina) **Benjamín Urdapilleta**	**Centres**: (Fiji) **Eneriko Buliruarua**; (New Zealand) **Braydon Ennor**; (Argentina) **Jerónimo de la Fuente**; (France) Maëlan Rabut; **Wings**: (France) Lucas Dubois; (France) Théo Forner; (France) Jefferson-Lee Joseph; (New Zealand) **Sevu Reece**; **Fullbacks**: (France) Antoine Aucagne; (South Africa) Tristan Tedder
**(c)** denotes the team captain. **Bold** denotes internationally capped players. Source:

USA Perpignan 2026–27 Espoirs squad
**Props**: (Spain) Joan Barcenilla D'ongha; (France) Aymane El Fahhal; (France) Louis Mas; (Georgia (country)) Giorgi Meskhidze; (France) Rudy Ndinda; (France) Mathys Pillac; (Spain) Sebastian Poroh; **Hookers**: (France) Melvyn Zafra; **Locks**: (France) Giani Callegari; (Romania) Alexandru Ion; (Georgia (country)) Davit Lagvlava; (France) Gabriel Pipi-Yoyotte; (France) Thomas Serezat	**Back row**: (France) Julen Guillot; (Spain) Ismael Millan; (France) Jad Ouazzani; (France) Jovan Sreckovic; (France) Simon Taty; **Scrum-halves**: (France) Hugo Baron; **Fly-halves**: (Spain) Marc Artiles; (France) Joan Llosent	**Centres**: (France) Martin Durand; (France) Anthony Guirado; (France) Diego Mascarenc; **Wings**: (France) Maxim Granell; (France) Aurelien Lecluze; (France) Simon Sol; (France) Setareki Toganiyadrava; **Fullbacks**: (France) Mayron Fahy; (Fiji) Charles Salkikoro
**(c)** denotes the team captain. **Bold** denotes internationally capped players. Source:

== Notable former players ==
- (Argentina) Federico Martín Aramburú
- (Argentina) Bautista Delguy
- (Argentina) Rimas Álvarez Kairelis
- (Argentina) Alejandro Allub
- (Argentina) José Orengo
- (Argentina) Sebastian Bozzi
- (Australia) Ryan Cross
- (Australia) Daniel Herbert
- (Australia) Justin Purll
- (Australia) Manny Edmonds
- (Cameroon) Robins Tchale-Watchou
- (Canada) Mike James
- (Canada) Phil Murphy
- (England) Alex Brown
- (England) Perry Freshwater
- (England) Richard Haughton
- (England) Dan Luger
- (England) Luke Narraway
- (England) Tim Stimpson
- (Fiji) Tevita Cavubati
- (Fiji) Samueli Naulu
- (Fiji) Alipate Ratini
- (Fiji) Eroni Sau
- (Fiji) Ben Volavola
- (Fiji) Watisoni Votu
- (France) Christophe André
- (France) Puig Aubert
- (France) Franck Azéma
- (France) Mathieu Barrau
- (France) Armand Batlle
- (France) Noël Brazès
- (France) Pascal Bomati
- (France) Benoît Bourrust
- (France) Élie Brousse
- (France) Gilbert Brutus
- (France) Benoît Cabello
- (France) Jacques Cabero
- (France) Didier Camberabero
- (France) Daniel Camiade
- (France) Julien Candelon
- (France) Florian Cazenave
- (France) Frédéric Cermeno
- (France) Damien Chouly
- (France) Georges Coste
- (France) Joseph Crespo
- (France) Marc Dal Maso
- (France) Vincent Debaty
- (France) Joseph Desclaux
- (France) Sébastien Descons
- (France) Nans Ducuing
- (France) Sylvain Dupuy
- (France) Nicolas Durand
- (France) Jérôme Fillol
- (France) Julien Fritz
- (France) Jean Galia
- (France) Charles Geli
- (France) Aimé Giral
- (France) Bernard Goutta
- (France) Raoul Got
- (France) Paul Goze
- (France) Jean-Philippe Grandclaude
- (France) Guilhem Guirado
- (France) Sofiane Guitoune
- (France) Raphaël Ibañez
- (France) Jean-Francois Imbernon
- (France) Melvyn Jaminet
- (France) David Janin
- (France) Jacques Jorda
- (France) Thierry Lacroix
- (France) Mickaël Ladhuie
- (France) Julien Laharrague
- (France) Nicolas Laharrague
- (France) Gregory Le Corvec
- (France) Marc Lièvremont
- (France) Matthieu Lièvremont
- (France) Thomas Lièvremont
- (France) Camille Lopez
- (France) Ludovic Loustau
- (France) Brice Mach
- (France) Lionel Mallier
- (France) David Marty
- (France) Nicolas Mas
- (France) Jo Maso
- (France) Sami Mavinga
- (France) Maxime Mermoz
- (France) Joffrey Michel
- (France) Romain Millo-Chluski
- (France) Olivier Olibeau
- (France) Vincent Planté
- (France) Christophe Porcu
- (France) Jerome Porical
- (France) Laurent Sempéré
- (France) Jérôme Schuster
- (France) Farid Sid
- (France) Jean-Marc Souverbie
- (France) Romain Taofifénua
- (France) Sébastien Taofifénua
- (France) Jérôme Thion
- (France) Sébastien Vahaamahina
- (France) Yohann Vivalda
- (France) Quentin Walcker
- (Georgia (country)) Dimitri Basilaia
- (Georgia (country)) Giorgi Jgenti
- (Georgia (country)) Davit Kubriashvili
- (Ireland) Mick O'Driscoll
- (Ireland) Paddy Jackson
- (Italy) Tommaso Allan
- (Italy) Tommaso Benvenuti
- (Italy) Ramiro Pez
- (New Zealand) Dan Carter
- (New Zealand) Scott Robertson
- (New Zealand) Eric Sione
- (Romania) Răzvan Mavrodin
- (Romania) Marius Țincu
- (Romania) Ovidiu Tonița
- (Romania) Johan van Heerden
- (South Africa) Rudi Coetzee
- (South Africa) Gavin Hume
- (South Africa) Steve Meyer
- (South Africa) Wandile Mjekevu
- (South Africa) Percy Montgomery
- (South Africa) Gert Muller
- (South Africa) Jacques-Louis Potgieter
- (Russia) Kirill Kulemin
- (Samoa) Manu Leiataua
- (Samoa) Henry Tuilagi
- (Scotland) Chris Cusiter
- (Scotland) Nathan Hines
- (Scotland) Alasdair Strokosch
- (Spain) Raphaël Bastide
- (Spain) Mathieu Bélie
- (Spain) David Mélé
- (Tonga) Lifeimi Mafi
- (Tonga) Tevita Mailau
- (Tonga) Sione Piukala
- (Tonga) Kisi Pulu
- (Tonga) Sona Taumalolo
- (Tonga) Viliami Vaki
- (United States) William Leon Jefferson
- (Wales) Richard Parks
- (Wales) James Hook
- (Wales) Luke Charteris

== See also ==
- List of rugby union clubs in France
- Rugby union in France
