= Jack McIntyre =

Jack McIntyre may refer to:

- Jack McIntyre (ice hockey) (1930–1998), Canadian ice hockey player
- Jack McIntyre (Australian footballer) (1881–1957), Australian rules footballer
- Jack McIntyre (English footballer) (born 2002), English football goalkeeper

== See also ==
- John McIntyre (disambiguation)
