= 1934–35 French Rugby Union Championship =

- Countries: France
- Champions: Biarritz
- Runners-up: Perpignan

The 1934–35 French Rugby Union Championship of first division was won by Biarritz that beat Perpignan in the final.

The tournament was played by 42 clubs divided in six pools of seven clubs.

Sixteen Club were qualified for the "second round" .

== Context ==
The La ligue française de rugby – XIII played its first competition. The 1935 International Championship was won by Ireland.

The France was excluded.

== Semifinals ==
apr. 1935	Perpignan	-	Vienne	11 - 10
apr. 1935	Biarritz	-	Stadoceste	10 - 3

== Final ==
Teams	Biarritz - Perpignan
Score	3 - 0
Date	12 May 1935
Venue	Stade des Ponts Jumeaux, Toulouse
Referee	Abel Martin
Line-up
Biarritz	Francis Daguerre, Paul Errecart, Alfred Guiné, Etienne Ithurra, Jean-Baptiste Lefort, Fernand Muniain, Paul Lafourcade, Louis Lascaray, René Laborde, Henri Haget, Joseph Pagola, Pierre Moulian, Claude Paquin, Frédéric Lafaillade, Rémi Sallenave
Perpignan	Egalité Casenove, Georges Vails, Joseph Munna, Augustin Bousquet, Ferdinand Danoy, Henri Gras, Jacques Palat, François Raynal, Roger Vails, Joseph Desclaux, Georges Rolland, Claude Barrère, Georges Bentouré, René Dauder, Paul Porical
Scorers
Biarritz	1 try Lascaray
Perpignan
