= John Kemp (New Zealand footballer) =

New Zealand footballer

Personal information
- Full name: John Gregory Kemp
- Date of birth: 21 March 1940
- Place of birth: Auckland, New Zealand
- Date of death: 28 December 1993 (aged 53)
- Place of death: Sydney, Australia
- Position: Centre-half

Senior career*
Years	Team	Apps	(Gls)
- Mount Roskill

International career
1960–1962	New Zealand	4	(0)
- * Club domestic league appearances and goals

John Kemp
Cricket information
- Batting: Left-handed

Domestic team information
- Years: Team
- 1960/61–1969/70: Auckland

Career statistics
Competition	First-class
Matches	25
Runs scored	1,086
Batting average	27.15
100s/50s	3/2
Top score	108
Catches/stumpings	16/–
- Source: CricketArchive, 5 November 2022

John Gregory Kemp (21 March 1940 – 28 December 1993) was an association football player who represented New Zealand at international level and played first-class cricket for Auckland.

== Football career ==
Kemp made his full New Zealand debut in a 5–1 win over Tahiti on 5 September 1960 and ended his international playing career with four official A-international caps to his credit, his final cap an appearance in a 4–2 win over New Caledonia on 4 June 1962.

== Cricket career ==
Kemp played 25 matches for Auckland in the Plunket Shield from 1960/61 to 1969/70, scoring 1,086 runs at an average of 27.15. He made his top score of 108 against Otago in December 1969, after Auckland had followed on, adding 140 for the eighth wicket with John McIntyre.

== Death ==
Kemp died in a Sydney hospital a week after receiving a second liver transplant, aged 53.
