= Stade Ernest-Wallon =

Rugby stadium in Toulouse, France

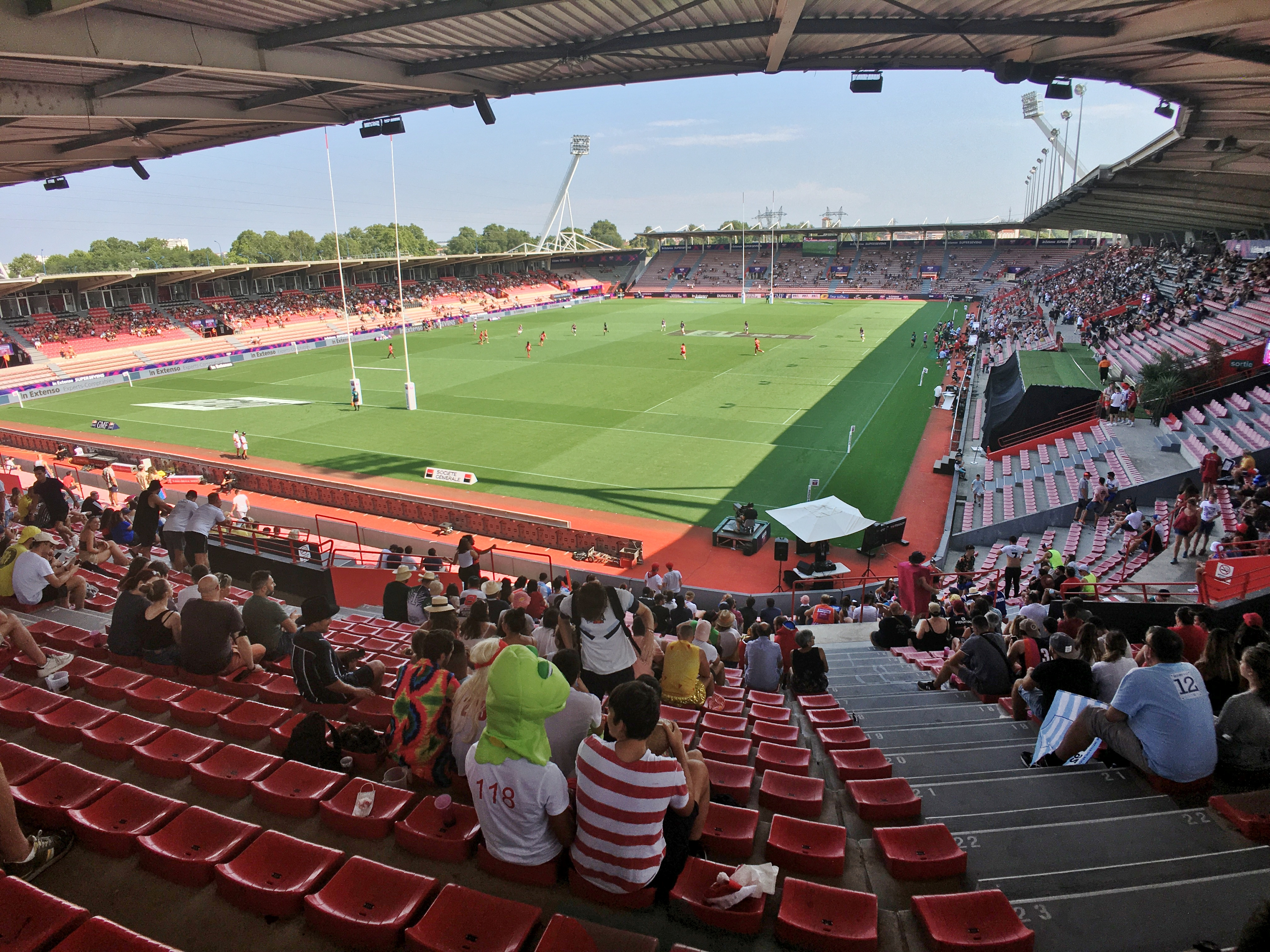
- A Supersevens match at the stadium, looking towards the southeast
- Interactive map of Stade Ernest-Wallon
- Location: 114 rue des Troènes; 31200 Toulouse, Occitania
- Coordinates: 43°37′19″N 1°24′58″E
- Owner: Stade Toulousain
- Capacity: 19,500
- Field size: 120 m × 70 m (131.2 yd × 76.6 yd)

Construction
- Opened: 4 December 1983
- Expanded: 2003

Tenants
- Stade Toulousain (1982–); Toulouse FC (2001–02); Toulouse Olympique (2020–)

The Stade Ernest-Wallon (French pronunciation: [stad ɛʁnɛst-walõ]; Occitan: Estadi Ernest-Wallon; lit. 'Ernest Wallon Stadium') is a multi-purpose stadium located in the Sept Deniers district of Toulouse, in southwestern France. Described as a "temple to the oval ball", it is the home ground for the rugby union club Stade Toulousain and the rugby league club Toulouse Olympique.

== History ==
When the land surrounding Stade Toulousian's home ground, the Stade des Ponts Jumeaux, was expropriated by the local government in order to build a motorway, they were compelled by law to offer the club land and funding to build identical facilities in exchange for the expropriation. The club chose a parcel of land about a kilometre away in the Sept-Deniers district and began construction of a new stadium in 1978. The Stade Ernest-Wallon was opened on 4 December 1983 with an international rugby union fixture; a first-division FIRA Trophy match which saw France's national team defeat Romania.

== Sports ==
=== Rugby union ===
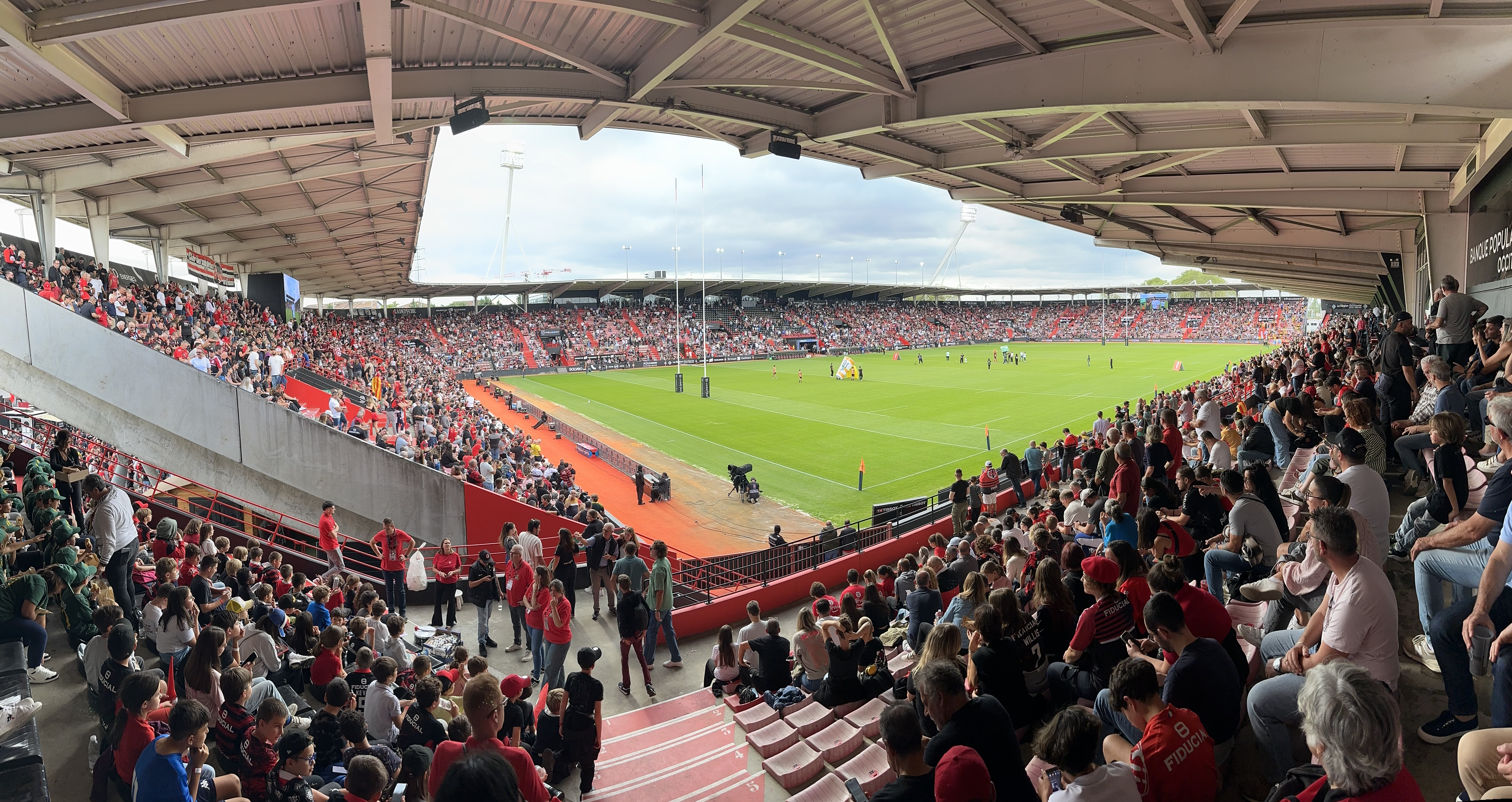
Inside the stadium during a Top 14 match in 2025.

In international rugby union competition, France's national men's team have not played at the stadium since their opening game in 1983, though the national women's team played against Ireland at the stadium in February 2018 during the team's eventual grand slam-winning Six Nations campaign. The national men's teams of other nations have played at the stadium, however. During the 1991 Rugby World Cup held in France, the stadium hosted a single game; a pool 4 match that saw Gabriel Vlad make his international debut for Romania in a defeat against Canada. End-of-year test matches in November 2017 between Japan and Tonga, and France and Japan, were originally planned to take place at the Stade Pierre-Mauroy in southeastern Lille. A scheduling conflict then arose with the semi-finals and final of the 2017 Davis Cup tennis tournament, which were also planned to be held at the Stade Pierre-Mauroy, leading to a relocation of the Japan–Tonga match to the Stade Ernest-Wallon and the France–Japan match to the U Arena in Nanterre. Japan recorded a victory of 33 points during the game, which is their biggest winning margin over Tonga in their history.

=== Rugby sevens ===
During the 2021–22 season of international rugby sevens competition, the Stade Ernest-Wallon became the new venue for the annual France Sevens and France Women's Sevens tournaments, taking over hosting duties from the Stade Jean-Bouin in Paris. While the men's tournament is one of the later stages of the men's seven series, the women's tournament serves as the final leg of the women's series, and the champion of the series is crowned at the stadium.

=== Rugby league ===
In international rugby league competition, France's national men's team have played three matches at the Stade Ernest-Wallon; two friendlies – a loss to Australia in November 2004, and a loss to England in June 2008 – and a Four Nations match in October 2009 which France lost to New Zealand. The Perpignan rugby league club Catalans Dragons, who play in the British rugby league system, played a regular season Super League home game at the Stade Ernest-Wallon in June 2013 to an unprecedented crowd of 14,858 spectators, as part of an initiative to promote rugby league in France as a Super League expansion opportunity during the era of the licensing system. The club, however, were fined £2,000 by the Rugby Football League for unsportsmanlike conduct of fans during the game.

From 2020, following an agreement reached with the Stade Toulousain, owner of the facilities, the rugby league club Toulouse Olympique also plays its home matches there. On 12 February 2022, The Stadium played host to Toulouse Olympique's first ever game in Super League against Huddersfield Giants, the Giants winning 42–12 in front of a crowd of 5,238.

== See also ==
- List of rugby union stadiums in France
- Lists of stadiums
