= Thibault Dubarry =

French professional rugby union player

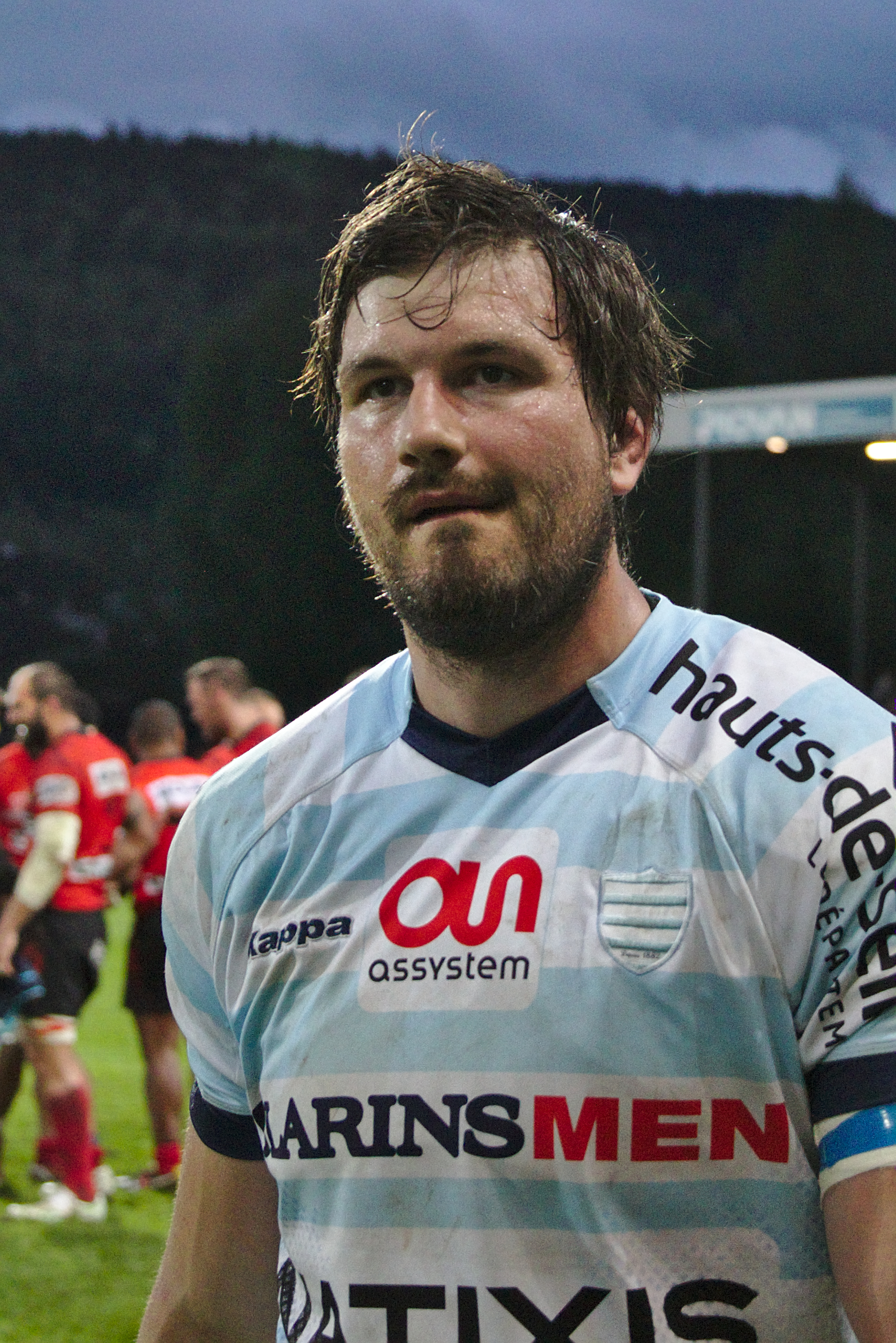
- Born: Thibault Dubarry; 24 November 1987 (age 38) Chartres, France
- Height: 1.98 m (6 ft 6 in)
- Weight: 104 kg (16 st 5 lb)

Rugby union career
- Position: Number 8
Senior career
Years	Team	Apps	(Points)
2009-2012	Brive	56	(5)
2012-2014	Biarritz	34	(5)
2014-17	Racing Métro	44	(0)
2017-19	Biarritz Olympique	18	(0)
2019-	Anglet Olympique	9	(0)
- Correct as of 20 December 2019

Thibault Dubarry (born 24 November 1987 in Chartres, France) is a French professional rugby union player. He plays at Number 8 for Racing Métro in the Top 14.
