= Biarritz Olympique =

French rugby union club, based in Biarritz

(France) Biarritz Olympique
- Full name: Biarritz Olympique Pays Basque
- Nickname: BO
- Founded: 24 April 1913; 113 years ago
- Location: Biarritz, France
- Ground: Parc des Sports Aguiléra (Capacity: 15,000)
- President: Shaun Hegarty
- Coach(es): Nicolas Nadau and Shaun Sowerby
- Captain: Steffon Armitage
- League: Pro D2
- 2024–25: 9th
1st kit	2nd kit

Official website
- www.bo-pb.com

Biarritz Olympique Pays Basque (French: [bjaʁits ɔlɛ̃pik pe.i bask]; lit. '"Biarritz Olympic, Basque Country"'), usually known simply as Biarritz, is a French professional rugby union team based in the Basque city of Biarritz in the Pyrénées-Atlantiques department of Nouvelle-Aquitaine which competes in the Pro D2, the second division of French rugby. Biarritz plays its home matches at the Parc des Sports Aguiléra, a multi-use stadium in Biarritz with a capacity of around 13,500 people, though for games that need a larger capacity, Biarritz may play at the Estadio Anoeta in San Sebastián. Biarritz play in red and white colours. Biarritz has won a number of major honors, including the French championship on five occasions.

Biarritz Olympique was formed in 1913 through the merger of the Biarritz Stade and Biarritz Sporting Club rugby teams. Biarritz made their way to the final of the French championship for the first time in the 1934 season where they were defeated by Bayonne. The following season they claimed their first championship, defeating Perpignan in the final. That decade Biarritz met Perpignan twice again in the final, winning one and losing one. It would not be until 1992 when the club made the final again, and then a decade later, winning the championship in 2002. The club won back-to-back titles in 2005 and 2006, and were runners-up in Europe in 2006 as well as 2010. In 2013–14, Biarritz won just five matches out of 26, and were relegated to the Pro D2 League. In 2020–21, they were promoted back to the Top 14 after a seven-year absence.

== History ==
=== Early years ===
The history of the club extends back to the late 19th century. An athletic club, Biarritz Stade (named that, in 1902) opened up a rugby quarter. In 1909, the Biarritz Sporting Club was established. On 26 April 1913, the fusion of the two clubs took place. The new name of the club was Biarritz Olympique and its inaugural president was M. P. Campagne. On 13 May 1934, Biarritz Olympique played in the final of the French premiership; they were however, defeated by Aviron Bayonnais 13 points to 8 at Stade des Ponts Jumeaux in Toulouse in front of 18,000 people. It was the only all-Basque final and is still the final in which the two contenders were separated by the shortest distance (3 miles), outside the all-Parisian finals of the late 19th century.

A year later, Biarritz again found themselves in the final of the national championship, this time against USA Perpignan. They emerged victorious, winning three points to nil, claiming their first ever national championship. The success continued in the latter stages of the decade. In the 1938 championship, Biarritz again met USAP in the final, though this time, the Perpignan club were able to get the win, Biarritz losing 11 points to six. A year later, the two clubs met in the final again, with Biarritz coming out as the better club on the day, winning six points to nil, and claiming the second national championship. But for almost 50 years, Biarritz was not going to feature prominently in the French league.

=== The 1980s and 1990s ===
It was not until the late 1980s that BO, as it is nicknamed, was going to reach the top again. In 1989 Biarritz contested their first Challenge Yves du Manoir final since the 1937 season. However, they were defeated by RC Narbonne 18–12 in the final. In 1992, Biarritz made it to the national final, played at Parc des Princes in Paris. However, Biarritz went down to RC Toulon 19 points to 14. In the 1997–98 season, Biarritz competed in their first European Rugby Cup competition, playing in the European Challenge Cup. Biarritz won three of their six fixtures, and did not make it past the pool stages. The 1998–99 season was similar to the previous, though they were able to win one more of their pool fixtures, but finished third in the pool standings after other French clubs Agen and Brive.

In their third Challenge Cup, Biarritz only lost one pool game and finished first in the standings. However, they were knocked out in the quarter-finals by English club Bristol. As well as the success in the Challenge Cup, in the 1999–00 season, they also won the Coupe de France for the first time since 1937, defeating CA Brive 24–13 in the final. Biarritz also earned qualification for the Heineken Cup.

=== 2000s ===
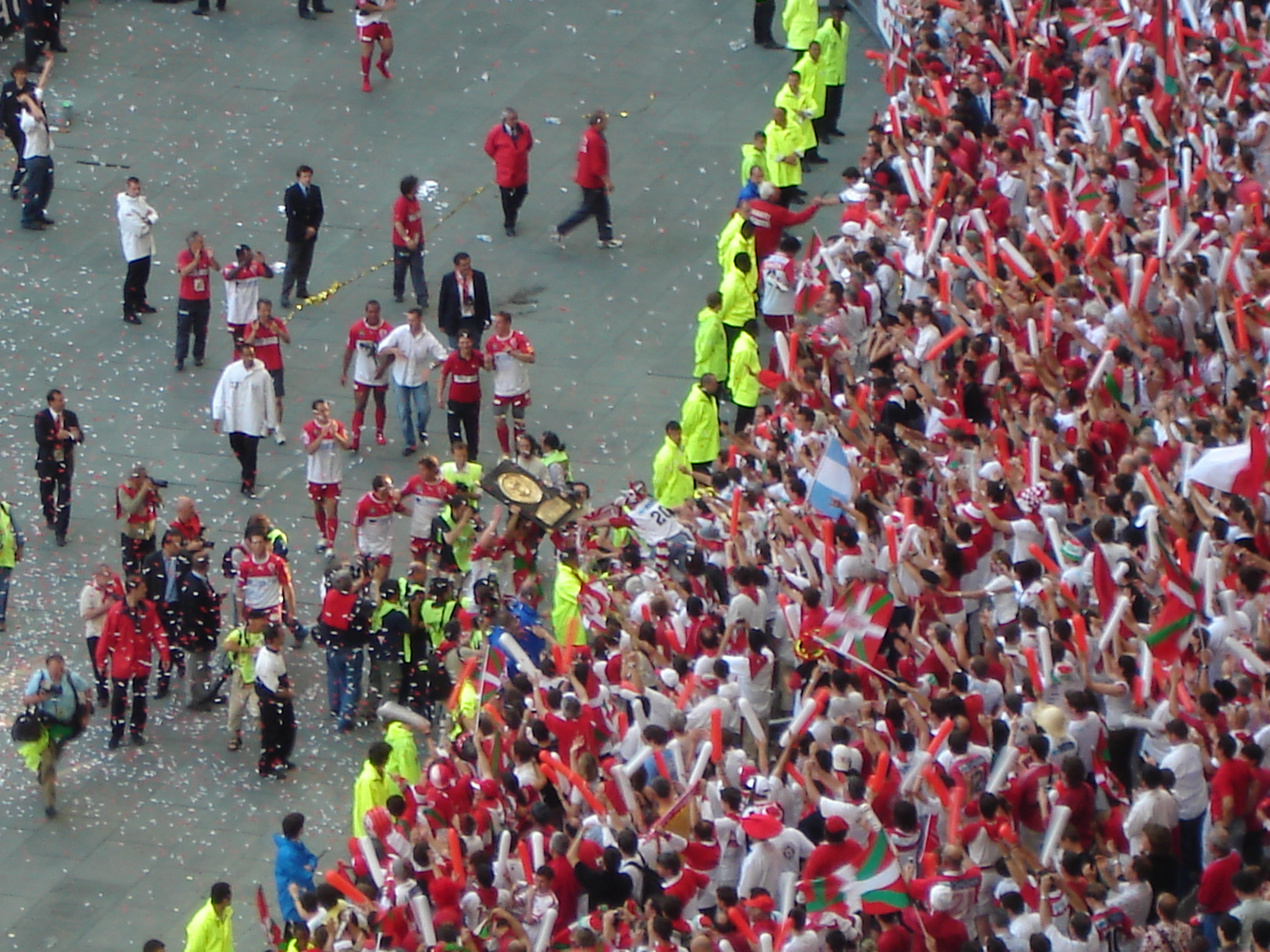
Celebrations after Biarritz' 2006 championship win over Toulouse.

The club finished at the top of their pool In the Heineken Cup, but were eliminated by Irish team Munster, losing 38–29 in the quarter-finals at Thomond Park. In the 2001–02 Heineken Cup Biarritz did not make the finals, finishing second in their pool, winning two of their six pool fixtures.

In 2002, Biarritz made their way to the domestic final for the first time in a decade. They defeated Agen 25 to 22 at Stade de France in Saint-Denis in front of 78,457. That season they were also runners-up to La Rochelle in the Coupe de France final, losing 21–19. The 2002–03 Heineken Cup was also a success for Biarritz, finishing at the top of their pool standings, they were quarter-finalists, but lost to Leinster 18–13 at Lansdowne Road in Dublin.

The 2003–04 Heineken Cup was the best-ever for Biarritz, as they made it to the semi-finals for the first time. They finished at the top of their pool and defeated the Llanelli Scarlets in the quarter-finals. They lost to fellow French club Toulouse 19–11 in the semi-finals. In 2004–05 Biarritz dropped only the one pool game against the London Wasps and finished at the top of their pool. They then defeated Munster in the quarter-finals, to repeat their success of the previous season by making the semi-finals. They, however, lost to Stade Français, 20–17 at Parc des Princes. More success followed in 2005, where they defeated the Stade Français club 37 points to 34 in the domestic final after a very rugged challenge.

In the year 2006, they made it to the Heineken Cup final where they met Munster. Although they lost their first pool game to the Saracens, Biarritz won the remaining matches and finished at the top of their pool, and defeated English clubs Sale and Bath in the finals to make the final. They lost the compelling game 19–23. They were, however, able to make it to the final of the 2005–06 Top 14, where they met Toulouse. Biarritz led nine points to six at half time but stormed to victory in the second half, the final score being 40 to 13, making Biarritz back-to-back winners. In the 2006–07 Heineken Cup Biarritz won all six of their pool games, topping their group with 29 points. They met fellow pool team Northampton Saints at Estadio Anoeta in the quarter-finals: Northampton upset Biarritz 8–7. In 2010, after finishing atop their pool, Biarritz defeated Ospreys and Munster, both at the Anoeta, and lost a hard-fought Heineken Cup final to Toulouse, 21–19, at Stade de France in Saint-Denis on Saturday, 22 May.

On 18 May 2012, Biarritz beat Top 14 rivals Toulon 21-18 in the 2012 Amlin Challenge Cup Final at Twickenham Stoop.

Biarritz played poorly during the 2013–14 Top 14 season, and ended up being relegated to the Rugby Pro D2 for the 2014–15 season.

== Stadium ==
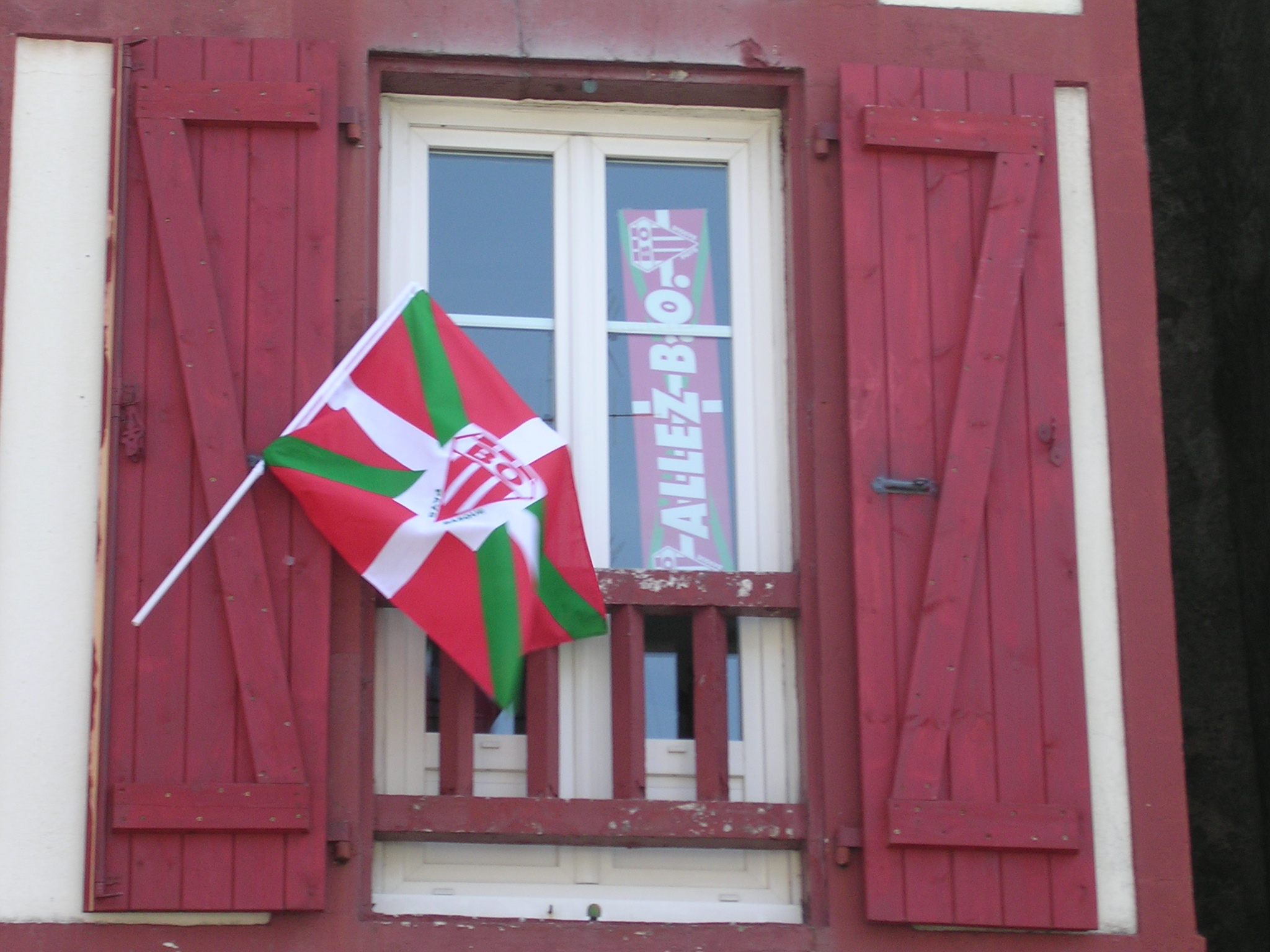
Basque flag with BOPB logo in a house of Biarritz

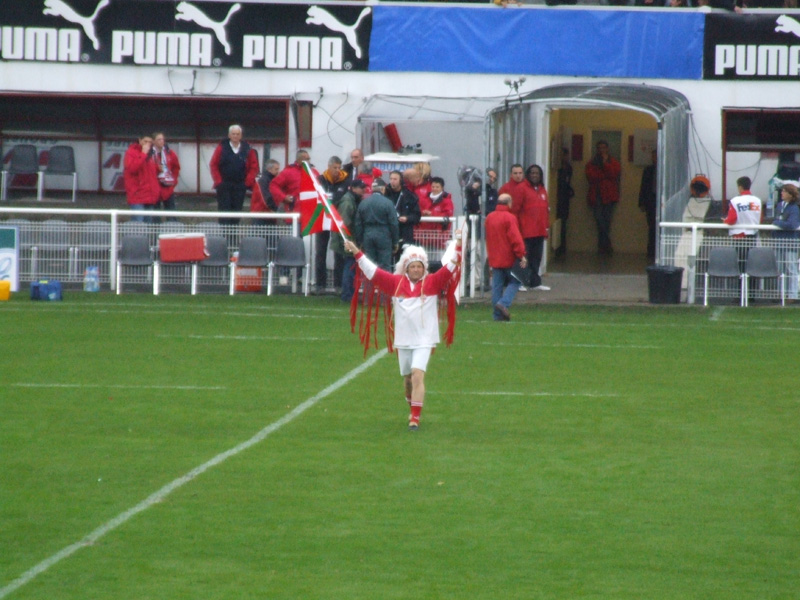
Rabagny (mascot)

Biarritz play their home matches at the Parc des Sports Aguiléra, which is a multi-use stadium in Biarritz. The stadium is used mostly for rugby and is able to hold around 13,500 people. Apart from Biarritz home games, the ground also hosted an international between the French Barbarians and Argentina.

Biarritz sometimes move larger games across the border to Estadio Anoeta in Donostia/San Sebastián, Spain. The Anoeta is the nearest stadium to Biarritz with a suitable capacity for matches such as a Heineken Cup semi-final, which must be played at a venue which can hold at least 20,000 spectators. The Anoeta holds well above that limit, at slightly over 32,000. The first such match held there was a victory over Munster in a quarter final of the 2004–05 Heineken Cup. In 2005–06 Biarritz played and won both their Heineken Cup quarter and semi-finals at the venue. The 2006–07 quarter-final against Northampton was also played there. In the 2009–10 Top 14 season, Biarritz took two league matches to the Anoeta—their home leg of the Northern Basque derby against Bayonne, and a home match against fellow traditional power Toulouse. They also played both of their knockout matches leading up to the 2010 Heineken Cup final at the Anoeta, defeating Ospreys in the quarter-finals and Munster in the semi-finals.

== Colours and name ==
Biarritz Olympique usually play in red and white colours. Green is the club's tertiary colour, as red, white and green are the traditional colours that represent the Basque Country. Their home uniform consists of red socks and shorts with a predominantly white shirt with red sides. A second jersey also has one green arm. For the 2015-16 season, their kit is produced by Macron. The main shirt sponsor is Capgemini.

In 1998, it adopted its current name (Biarritz Olympique Pays Basque), which refers to the club's Basque heritage the name is often abbreviated as BOPB. The club logo is a red and white shield with the B and O in the middle. The words Pays Basque also appear on either side of the logo in green.

== Supporters ==
The Biarritz supporters sometimes wave the Basque flag in the stands. Traditional Basque songs are also heard, as Basque supporters have a reputation for being very good singers. The Parc des Sports Aguilera is considered an intimidating venue to play at, with Biarritz supporters having a reputation for being very vocal.

== Honours ==
- French championship Top 14
  - Champions (5): 1935, 1939, 2002, 2005, 2006
  - Runners-up (3): 1934, 1938, 1992
- Heineken Cup / European Rugby Champions Cup
  - Runners-up (2): 2006, 2010
- European Rugby Challenge Cup
  - Champions (1): 2012
- Challenge Yves du Manoir
  - Champions (1): 1937
  - Runners-up (1): 1989
- French Cup
  - Champions (1): 2000

== Finals results ==
=== French championship ===
Date	Winners	Score	Runners-up	Venue	Spectators
13 May 1934	Aviron Bayonnais	13–8	Biarritz Olympique	Stade des Ponts Jumeaux, Toulouse	18.000
12 May 1935	Biarritz Olympique	3–0	USA Perpignan	Stade des Ponts Jumeaux, Toulouse	23.000
8 May 1938	USA Perpignan	11–6	Biarritz Olympique	Stade des Ponts Jumeaux, Toulouse	24.600
30 April 1939	Biarritz Olympique	6–0 (aet)	USA Perpignan	Stade des Ponts Jumeaux, Toulouse	23.000
6 June 1992	RC Toulon	19–3	Biarritz Olympique	Parc des Princes, Paris	48.000
8 June 2002	Biarritz Olympique	25–22 (aet)	SU Agen	Stade de France, Saint-Denis	78.457
11 June 2005	Biarritz Olympique	37–34 (aet)	Stade Français Paris	Stade de France, Saint-Denis	79.475
10 June 2006	Biarritz Olympique	40–13	Stade Toulousain	Stade de France, Saint-Denis	79.474

=== Heineken Cup / European Rugby Champions Cup ===
Date	Winners	Score	Runners-up	Venue	Spectators
20 May 2006	(Ireland) Munster	23–19	(France) Biarritz Olympique	Millennium Stadium, Cardiff	74,534
22 May 2010	(France) Stade Toulousain	21–19	(France) Biarritz Olympique	Stade de France, Saint-Denis	78,962

=== European Rugby Challenge Cup ===
Date	Winners	Score	Runners-up	Venue	Spectators
18 May 2012	(France) Biarritz Olympique	21–18	(France) RC Toulon	The Stoop, London	9,376

=== Challenge Yves du Manoir ===
Date	Winners	Score	Runners-up
1937	Biarritz Olympique	9–3	USA Perpignan
1989	RC Narbonne	18–12	Biarritz Olympique

=== French Cup ===
Date	Winners	Score	Runners-up	Spectators
2000	Biarritz Olympique	24–13	CA Brive	17,500

== Current standings ==
2025–26 Pro D2 Table
Pos	Team	Pld	W	D	L	PF	PA	PD	TB	LB	Pts	Qualification
1	Vannes	30	24	1	5	1092	543	+549	15	3	116	Semi-final promotion playoff place
2	Colomiers	30	21	0	9	847	522	+325	8	3	95	Semi-final promotion playoff place
3	Provence	30	19	0	11	905	726	+179	9	7	92	Quarter-final promotion playoff place
4	Oyonnax	30	17	0	13	953	659	+294	9	9	86	Quarter-final promotion playoff place
5	Valence Romans	30	19	0	11	803	760	+43	4	4	84	Quarter-final promotion playoff place
6	Brive	30	17	1	12	906	642	+264	11	2	83	Quarter-final promotion playoff place
7	Agen	30	15	0	15	796	750	+46	9	3	72	
8	Grenoble	30	14	0	16	739	829	−90	2	4	62	
9	Soyaux Angoulême	30	13	0	17	576	770	−194	2	5	59	
10	Biarritz	30	12	1	17	762	879	−117	8	1	54	
11	Dax	30	14	0	16	706	742	−36	6	7	55	
12	Béziers	30	12	0	18	657	804	−147	4	4	56	
13	Nevers	30	11	1	18	760	1024	−264	4	3	53	
14	Aurillac	30	11	0	19	718	908	−190	2	7	53	
15	Mont-de-Marsan	30	11	1	18	701	950	−249	3	2	51	Relegation play-off
16	Carcassonne	30	7	1	22	572	985	−413	0	5	35	Relegation to Nationale

Updated to match(es) played on 17 May 2026. Source:

== Current squad ==
The Biarritz squad for the 2025–26 season is:

Biarritz Olympique 2025-26 Pro D2 squad
**Props**: (Morocco) **Zakaria El Fakir**; (France) Francois Mur; (Georgia (country)) **Giorgi Nutsubidze**; (France) Alexandre Plantier; (France) Quentin Samaran; (New Zealand) Solomone Tukuafu; **Hookers**: (France) Yohan Beheregaray; (France) Clément Martinez; (France) Adrien Sonzogni; **Locks**: (South Africa) Heath Backhouse; (Fiji) **John Dyer**; (Samoa) **Piula Fa'asalele**; (South Africa) Aston Fortuin; (France) Aitor Hourcade	**Back row**: (France) Rémi Bourdeau; (France) Thomas Hébert; (Spain) **Ekain Imaz**; (Switzerland) **Jessy Jegerlehner**; (France) Alban Placines; (Scotland) **Cornell du Preez**; (France) Filimo Taofifénua; (France) Yoni Tuataane; **Scrum-halves**: (Spain) **Kerman Aurrekoetxea**; (France) Imanol Biscay; (France) **Yann Lesgourgues**; **Fly-halves**: (France) Eliott Arandiga; (France) Thomas Dolhagaray; (France) Edgar Retière; (France) Enzo Selponi	**Centres**: (France) **Yann David**; (France) Jules Even; (France) Dorian Laborde; (Brazil) **Carlo Mignot**; (Wales) **Tyler Morgan**; (France) Sam Spring; **Wings**: (France) Steeve Barry; (France) Arthur Bonneval; (France) Mathieu Acebes; (France) Bastien Guillemin; (France) Yohan Tapie; **Fullbacks**: (France) Baptiste Fariscot; (France) Kylian Jaminet; (England) Zach Kibirige
**(c)** denotes the team captain. (vc) denotes vice-captain. **Bold** denotes internationally capped players.^{ST} denotes a short-term signing. Source:

Beziers 2025-26 Pro D2 squad
**Props**: (France) Peio Dospital; (France) Kepa Ebode-Nkoa; (Georgia (country)) Temur Khutuashvili; (France) Kilimeno Manuopuava; (Fiji) Raymond Navunikaba; (France) Timothe Pelloux; (France) Ilyes Seddi; (Argentina) Bruno Vagni; **Hookers**: (France) Anas Barara; (Spain) Unax Goikoetxea; (France) Millian Ouldji; **Locks**: (France) Lucas Delos; (Ukraine) Stanislav Kucherenko; (Spain) Manex Marono Gainza; (Spain) Markel Odriozola; (France) Jules Soubran	**Back row**: (France) Arthur Calvet; (France) Solomon Iboeba; (France) Romeo Petit; (France) André Sacco; (Fiji) Luka Tavalu; **Scrum-halves**: (Italy) Niccolo Beni; (France) Anoa Laurent; (France) Hugo Mazas; **Fly-halves**: (France) Raphaёl Dubois	**Centres**: (France) Teo Hirschier; (France) marius Larribaud; (Australia) Cynseah Tautalafua; (Spain) Oier Zabalbeaskoa; **Wings**: (France) Nicolas Elissondo; (Australia) Seth Teo'o; **Fullbacks**: (France) Yoan Borges; (France) Andoni Echegaray
**(c)** denotes the team captain. (vc) denotes vice-captain. **Bold** denotes internationally capped players.^{ST} denotes a short-term signing. Source:

== Notable former players ==
- (Argentina) Federico Martín Aramburú
- (Argentina) Marcelo Bosch
- (Argentina) Manuel Carizza
- (Argentina) Agustín Creevy
- (Argentina) Tomás Cubelli
- (Argentina) Martín Gaitán
- (Argentina) Francisco Gómez Kodela
- (Argentina) Eusebio Guiñazú
- (Australia) Luke Burton
- (Australia) Rodney Davies
- (Australia) Dane Haylett-Petty
- (Australia) Leroy Houston
- (Australia) Karmichael Hunt
- (Australia) Jack Isaac
- (Australia) Joe Roff
- (Australia) Haig Sare
- (Australia) Joe Tomane
- (Canada) Evan Olmstead
- (England) Steffon Armitage
- (England) Iain Balshaw
- (England) Daniel Caprice
- (England) Ayoola Erinle
- (England) Brett Herron
- (England) Magnus Lund
- (England) Richard Pool-Jones
- (Fiji) Sireli Bobo
- (Fiji) Seremaia Burotu
- (Fiji) Adriu Delai
- (Fiji) Nemia Soqeta
- (Fiji) Kalivati Tawake
- (France) Benoit August
- (France) Denis Avril
- (France) Marc Baget
- (France) Fabien Barcella
- (France) Pierre Bernard
- (France) Jean-Pascal Barraque
- (France) Philippe Bernat-Salles
- (France) Serge Betsen
- (France) Philippe Bidabé
- (France) Serge Blanco
- (France) Sébastien Bonetti
- (France) Benoît Bourrust
- (France) Guillaume Boussès
- (France) Nicolas Brusque
- (France) Romain Cabannes
- (France) Jean-Emmanuel Cassin
- (France) Michel Celaya
- (France) Fabien Cibray
- (France) Jean Condom
- (France) David Couzinet
- (France) Valentin Courrent
- (France) Benjamin Dambielle
- (France) Clément Darbo
- (France) André Darrieussecq
- (France) Thibault Dubarry
- (France) Julien Dufau
- (France) Julien Dupuy
- (France) Thierry Dusautoir
- (France) Pépito Elhorga
- (France) Jean-Martin Etchenique
- (France) Florian Faure
- (France) Fernand Forgues
- (France) Philippe Gimbert
- (France) Jean-Baptiste Gobelet
- (France) Jean-Michel Gonzalez
- (France) André Haget
- (France) Francis Haget
- (France) Henri Haget
- (France) Kylan Hamdaoui
- (France) Imanol Harinordoquy
- (France) Arnaud Héguy
- (France) Marcel Jol
- (France) Thibault Lacroix
- (France) Patrice Lagisquet
- (France) Raphaël Lakafia
- (France) Jean Larribau
- (France) Grégoire Lascubé
- (France) Wenceslas Lauret
- (France) Benoît Lecouls
- (France) Yann Lesgourgues
- (France) Marc Lièvremont
- (France) Thomas Lièvremont
- (France) Laurent Magnaval
- (France) Sylvain Marconnet
- (France) Jimmy Marlu
- (France) Legi Matiu
- (France) Alexandre Menini
- (France) Arnaud Mignardi
- (France) Christophe Milhères
- (France) Franck Montanella
- (France) Benjamin Noirot
- (France) Olivier Olibeau
- (France) Pascal Ondarts
- (France) Julien Peyrelongue
- (France) Alexandre Roumat
- (France) Olivier Roumat
- (France) David Roumieu
- (France) Romain Ruffenach
- (France) Julien Saubade
- (France) Benjamin Thiéry
- (France) Jérôme Thion
- (France) Teddy Thomas
- (France) Sébastien Tillous-Borde
- (France) Damien Traille
- (France) Yvan Watremez
- (France) Dimitri Yachvili
- (Georgia (country)) Vakhtang Akhobadze
- (Italy) Santiago Dellapè
- (Italy) Andrea Masi
- (Italy) Gonzalo Padro
- (New Zealand) Frano Botica
- (New Zealand) Campbell Johnstone
- (New Zealand) Glen Osborne
- (New Zealand) Francis Saili
- (New Zealand) Daniel Waenga
- (Norway) Erik Lund
- (Romania) Petru Bălan
- (Romania) Ovidiu Tonița
- (Samoa) Henry Fa'afili
- (Samoa) Josh Tyrell
- (Samoa) Census Johnston
- (Samoa) Kas Lealamanua
- (Scotland) Nick De Luca
- (South Africa) Wicus Blaauw
- (South Africa) Jacques Cronjé
- (South Africa) Willie du Plessis
- (South Africa) Trevor Hall
- (South Africa) Philip van der Walt
- (South Africa) Ashwin Willemse
- (United States) Takudzwa Ngwenya
- (United States) Thretton Palamo
- (Tonga) Ueleni Fono
- (Tonga) Kurt Morath
- (Tonga) Samiu Vahafolau
- (Wales) Aled Brew
- (Wales) Ben Broster

== See also ==
- List of rugby union clubs in France
- Rugby union in France
