= Benoît Bourrust =

French rugby union player

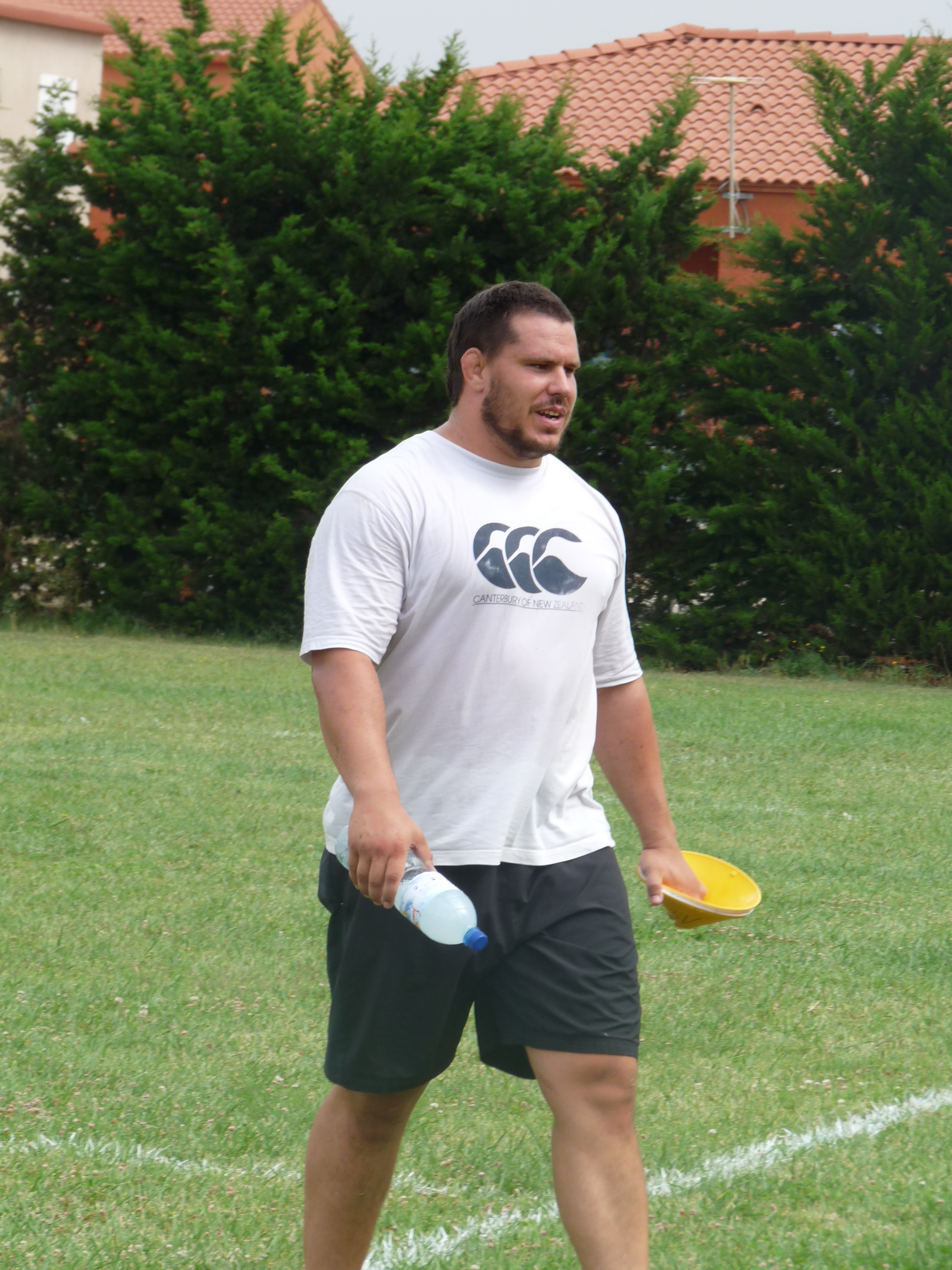
- Born: Benoît Bourrust; 16 June 1985 (age 41) Auch, France
- Height: 185 cm (6 ft 1 in)
- Weight: 124 kg (19 st 7 lb)

Rugby union career
- Position: Prop Forward
- Current team: Stade Rochelais
Senior career
Years	Team	Apps	(Points)
2004–07	FC Auch	48	(20)
2007–08	Sale Sharks	4	(5)
2008–09	Biarritz Olympique	23	(0)
2009–12	USA Perpignan	45	(5)
2012–14	Cardiff Blues	37	(0)
2014-15	Stade Rochelais	12	(0)
- Correct as of 10 Nov 2012

Benoît Bourrust (born 16 Jun 1985) is a French rugby union player. A prop forward, he played for Auch, Sale Sharks and Perpignan.

For the start of the 2012–13 season he signed for Welsh team Cardiff Blues.
