= Johnny McIntyre =

Johnny McIntyre is the name of:

- Johnny McIntyre (footballer, born 1895), Scottish professional footballer who played in England for Sheffield Wednesday
- Johnny McIntyre (footballer, born 1898), Scottish professional footballer who played in England for Derby County and Chesterfield
- Johnny McIntyre (footballer, born 1956), Scottish professional footballer, winger in Scotland for Clydebank and France for AS Cherbourg

== See also ==
- John McIntyre (disambiguation)
