= List of France national rugby league team results =

The France national rugby league team first played in 1934 on a tour of England. They have taken part in all World Cups, twelve in total, with the first being held in 1954 in France. They have never won the title but have finished runners-up in both 1954 and 1968.

== All-time results record ==
Below are the France international XIII results up until 22 February 2025.

Opponent	Played	Won	Drawn	Lost	% Won	For	Aga	Diff
Australia	61	14	2	45	22.95%	547	1476	–929
(United Kingdom) (Australia) British Empire XIII	2	1	0	1	50%	23	25	–2
Canada	1	1	0	0	100%	72	32	+40
Dominion XIII	2	1	0	1	100%	11	11	0
England	53	7	2	44	13.21%	540	1454	–914
England Knights	7	1	0	6	14.29%	109	208	–99
Fiji	2	0	0	2	0%	18	62	–44
Georgia	1	1	0	0	100%	60	0	+60
Great Britain	75	19	4	52	25.33%	796	1762	–966
Greece	1	1	0	0	100%	34	12	+22
Ireland	9	7	1	1	77.78%	295	172	+123
Italy	1	0	0	1	0%	10	14	–4
Jamaica	1	1	0	0	100%	186	10	+176
Kenya	2	2	0	0	100%	186	10	+176
Lebanon	4	1	0	3	25%	80	115	–35
Morocco	4	4	0	0	100%	232	24	+208
New Zealand	56	16	5	35	28.57%	592	1065	–473
Māori	4	2	0	2	50%	60	52	+8
Other Nationalities	6	2	0	4	33.33%	77	99	–22
Papua New Guinea	14	9	1	4	64.29%	281	249	+32
Rest of the World	1	1	0	0	100%	21	20	+1
Russia	8	8	0	0	100%	371	54	+317
Samoa	5	1	0	4	20%	58	188	–130
Scotland	11	9	0	2	81.82%	326	198	+128
Serbia	4	4	0	0	100%	284	22	+262
South Africa	2	2	0	0	100%	86	23	+63
Tonga	2	1	0	1	50%	38	56	–18
Ukraine	1	1	0	0	100%	74	8	+66
United States	2	1	0	1	50%	49	22	+27
Wales	44	26	0	18	59.09%	761	649	+112
Total	385	143	15	227	37.14%	6,231	8,086	–1,855

== 1930s ==
Date	Home	Score	Away	Competition	Venue	Attendance
15 April 1934	France	21–32	England	Friendly	(France) Stade Buffalo, Paris	20,000
1 January 1935	France	18–11	Wales	1935 European Rugby League Championship	(France) Stade Chaban–Delmas, Bordeaux	15,000
28 March 1935	France	15–15	England	1935 European Rugby League Championship	(France) Stade Buffalo, Paris	18,000
23 November 1935	Wales	41–7	France	1935–36 European Rugby League Championship	(Wales) Stebonheath Park, Llanelli	25,000
16 February 1936	France	7–25	England	1935–36 European Rugby League Championship	(France) Stade Buffalo, Paris	25,000
6 December 1936	France	3–9	Wales	1936–37 European Rugby League Championship	(France) Stade de Paris, Paris	17,000
10 April 1937	England	23–9	France	1936–37 European Rugby League Championship	(England) Thrum Hall, Halifax	7,024
2 January 1938	France	6–35	Australia	1937–38 Kangaroo tour of Great Britain and France	(France) Stade Buffalo, Paris	11,500
16 January 1938	France	11–16	Australia	1937–38 Kangaroo tour of Great Britain and France	(France) Stade Velodrome, Marseille	24,000
20 March 1938	France	15–17	England	1938 European Rugby League Championship	(France) Stade Buffalo, Paris	18,000
2 April 1938	Wales	18–2	France	1938 European Rugby League Championship	(Wales) Stebonheath Park, Llanelli	20,000
25 February 1939	England	9–12	France	1938–39 European Rugby League Championship	(England) Knowsley Road, St. Helens	10,000
16 April 1939	France	16–10	Wales	1938–39 European Rugby League Championship	(France) Stade Chaban–Delmas, Bordeaux	25,000

== 1940s ==
Date	Home	Score	Away	Competition	Venue	Attendance
23 February 1946	England	16–6	France	1945–46 European Rugby League Championship	(England) Station Road, Swinton	20,000
24 March 1946	France	19–7	Wales	1945–46 European Rugby League Championship	(France) Stade Chaban–Delmas, Bordeaux	18,000
8 December 1946	France	0–3	England	1946–47 European Rugby League Championship	(France) Stade Chaban–Delmas, Bordeaux	24,100
18 January 1947	France	14–5	Wales	1946–47 European Rugby League Championship	(France) Stade Velodrome, Marseille	24,500
12 April 1947	Wales	17–15	France	1946–47 European Rugby League Championship	(Wales) St Helens Rugby Ground, Swansea	20,000
17 May 1947	England	5–2	France	1946–47 European Rugby League Championship	(England) Headingley, Leeds	21,000
25 October 1947	England	20–15	France	1947–48 European Rugby League Championship	(England) Fartown Ground, Huddersfield	14,175
23 November 1947	France	29–21	Wales	1947–48 European Rugby League Championship	(France) Stade Chaban–Delmas, Bordeaux	26,000
28 December 1947	France	7–11	New Zealand	1947–48 New Zealand rugby league tour of Great Britain and France	(France) Parc des Princes, Paris	15,000
25 January 1948	France	25–7	New Zealand	1947–48 New Zealand rugby league tour of Great Britain and France	(France) Stade Chaban–Delmas, Bordeaux	22,000
20 March 1948	Wales	12–20	France	1947–48 European Rugby League Championship	(Wales) St Helens Rugby Ground, Swansea	6,500
11 April 1948	France	10–25	England	1947–48 European Rugby League Championship	(France) Stade Velodrome, Marseille	32,000
23 October 1948	Wales	9–12	France	1948–49 European Rugby League Championship	(Wales) St Helens Rugby Ground, Swansea	12,032
28 November 1948	France	5–12	England	1948–49 European Rugby League Championship	(France) Stade Chaban–Delmas, Bordeaux	26,000
9 January 1949	France	10–29	Australia	1948–49 Kangaroo tour of Great Britain and France	(France) Stadium Municipal, Toulouse	15,796
23 January 1949	France	0–10	Australia	1948–49 Kangaroo tour of Great Britain and France	(France) Stadium Municipal, Toulouse	17,365
12 March 1949	England	5–12	France	1948–49 European Rugby League Championship	(England) Empire Stadium, London	12,382
10 April 1949	France	11–0	Wales	1948–49 European Rugby League Championship	(France) Stade Velodrome, Marseille	30,000
12 November 1949	Wales	16–8	France	1949–50 European Rugby League Championship	(Wales) St Helens Rugby Ground, Swansea	4,749
4 December 1949	France	5–13	England	1949–50 European Rugby League Championship	(France) Stade Chaban–Delmas, Bordeaux	20,598

== 1950s ==
Date	Home	Score	Away	Competition	Venue	Attendance
15 January 1950	France	8–3	Other Nationalities	1949–50 European Rugby League Championship	(France) Stade Velodrome, Marseille	22,580
11 November 1950	England	14–9	France	1950–51 European Rugby League Championship	(England) Headingley, Leeds	22,000
10 December 1950	France	16–3	Other Nationalities	1950–51 European Rugby League Championship	(France) Stade Chaban–Delmas, Bordeaux	28,000
15 April 1951	France	28–13	Wales	1950–51 European Rugby League Championship	(France) Stade Velodrome, Marseille	18,000
11 June 1951	Australia	15–26	France	1951 France rugby league tour of Australia and New Zealand	(Australia) Sydney Cricket Ground, Sydney	60,160
30 June 1951	Australia	23–11	France	1951 France rugby league tour of Australia and New Zealand	(Australia) Brisbane Cricket Ground, Brisbane	35,000
21 July 1951	Australia	14–35	France	1951 France rugby league tour of Australia and New Zealand	(Australia) Sydney Cricket Ground, Sydney	67,009
4 August 1951	New Zealand	16–15	France	1951 France rugby league tour of Australia and New Zealand	(New Zealand) Carlaw Park, Auckland	19,229
3 November 1951	Other Nationalities	17–14	France	1951–52 European Rugby League Championship	(England) Craven Park, Hull	18,000
25 November 1951	France	42–13	England	1951–52 European Rugby League Championship	(France) Stade Velodrome, Marseille	31,810
23 December 1951	France	8–3	New Zealand	1951–52 New Zealand rugby league tour of Great Britain and France	(France) Parc des Princes, Paris	23,459
30 December 1951	France	17–7	New Zealand	1951–52 New Zealand rugby league tour of Great Britain and France	(France) Stade Chaban–Delmas, Bordeaux	11,110
6 April 1952	France	20–12	Wales	1952–53 European Rugby League Championship	(France) Stade Chaban–Delmas, Bordeaux	15,678
22 May 1952	France	22–12	Great Britain	Friendly	(France) Parc des Princes, Paris	16,466
25 October 1952	Wales	22–16	France	1952–53 European Rugby League Championship	(England) Headingley, Leeds	10,380
23 November 1952	France	10–29	Other Nationalities	1952–53 European Rugby League Championship	(France) Stade Velodrome, Marseille	17,611
27 December 1952	France	12–16	Australia	1952–53 Kangaroo tour of Great Britain and France	(France) Parc des Princes, Paris	20,000
11 January 1953	France	5–0	Australia	1952–53 Kangaroo tour of Great Britain and France	(France) Stade Chaban–Delmas, Bordeaux	23,419
25 January 1953	France	13–5	Australia	1952–53 Kangaroo tour of Great Britain and France	(France) Stade de Gerland, Lyon	17,454
11 April 1953	France	13–15	England	1952–53 European Rugby League Championship	(France) Parc des Princes, Paris	25,000
24 May 1953	France	28–17	Great Britain	Friendly	(France) Stade de Gerland, Lyon	?
18 October 1953	France	10–15	Other Nationalities	1953–54 European Rugby League Championship	(France) Stadium Municipal, Toulouse	12,190
5 November 1953	England	7–5	France	1953–54 European Rugby League Championship	(England) Odsal Stadium, Bradford	10,659
13 December 1953	France	23–22	Wales	1953–54 European Rugby League Championship	(France) Stade Velodrome, Marseille	25,000
9 January 1954	France	31–0	United States	Friendly	(France) Parc des Princes, Paris	9,000
27 April 1954	Great Britain	17–8	France	Friendly	(United Kingdom) Odsal Stadium, Bradford	14,153
30 October 1954	France	22–13	New Zealand	1954 Rugby League World Cup	(France) Parc des Princes Paris	13,240
7 November 1954	France	13–13	Great Britain	1954 Rugby League World Cup	(France) Stadium Municipal, Toulouse	37,471
11 November 1954	France	15–5	Australia	1954 Rugby League World Cup	(France) Stade Marcel Saupin, Nantes	13,000
13 November 1954	France	12–16	Great Britain	1954 Rugby League World Cup final	(France) Parc des Princes, Paris	30,368
11 June 1955	Australia	20–8	France	1955 France rugby league tour of Australia and New Zealand	(Australia) Sydney Cricket Ground, Sydney	67,748
2 July 1955	Australia	28–29	France	1955 France rugby league tour of Australia and New Zealand	(Australia) Brisbane Cricket Ground, Brisbane	45,745
23 July 1955	Australia	5–8	France	1955 France rugby league tour of Australia and New Zealand	(Australia) Sydney Cricket Ground, Sydney	62,458
6 August 1955	New Zealand	9–19	France	1955 France rugby league tour of Australia and New Zealand	(New Zealand) Carlaw Park, Auckland	20,500
10 August 1955	New Zealand Māori	28–20	France	1955 France rugby league tour of Australia and New Zealand	(New Zealand) Carlaw Park, Auckland	Unknown
13 August 1955	New Zealand	11–6	France	1955 France rugby league tour of Australia and New Zealand	(New Zealand) Carlaw Park, Auckland	12,000
19 September 1955	Other Nationalities	32–19	France	1955–56 European Rugby League Championship	(England) Hilton Park, Leigh	7,289
11 December 1955	France	17–5	Great Britain	Friendly	(France) Parc des Princes, Paris	18,000
8 January 1956	France	24–7	New Zealand	1955–56 New Zealand rugby tour of Great Britain and France	(France) Stadium Municipal, Toulouse	10,184
15 January 1956	France	22–31	New Zealand	1955–56 New Zealand rugby tour of Great Britain and France	(France) Stade de Gerland, Lyon	7,051
31 January 1956	France	24–3	New Zealand	1955–56 New Zealand rugby tour of Great Britain and France	(France) Parc des Princes, Paris	14,752
11 April 1956	Great Britain	18–10	France	Friendly	(United Kingdom) Odsal Stadium, Bradford	10,453
10 May 1956	France	23–9	England	1955–56 European Rugby League Championship	(France) Stade de Gerland, Lyon	?
1 November 1956	France	8–15	Australia	1956–57 Kangaroo tour of Great Britain and France	(France) Parc des Princes, Paris	10,789
23 December 1956	France	6–10	Australia	1956–57 Kangaroo tour of Great Britain and France	(France) Stadium Municipal, Bordeaux	11,379
3 January 1957	France	21–25	Australia	1956–57 Kangaroo tour of Great Britain and France	(France) Stade de Gerland, Lyon	5,743
26 January 1957	Great Britain	45–12	France	Test Match	(United Kingdom) Headingley, Leeds	20,221
3 March 1957	France	19–19	Great Britain	Test Match	(France) Stade Municipal, Toulouse	20,000
10 April 1957	Great Britain	29–14	France	Test Match	(United Kingdom) Knowsley Road, St. Helens	20,928
15 June 1957	France	5–23	Great Britain	1957 Rugby League World Cup	(Australia) Sydney Cricket Ground, Sydney	50,077
17 June 1957	France	14–10	New Zealand	1957 Rugby League World Cup	(Australia) Brisbane Exhibition Ground, Brisbane	28,000
22 June 1957	Australia	26–9	France	1957 Rugby League World Cup	(Australia) Sydney Cricket Ground, Sydney	35,158
3 November 1957	France	14–25	Great Britain	Test Match	(France) Stade Municipal, Toulouse	15,762
23 November 1957	Great Britain	44–15	France	Test Match	(United Kingdom) Central Park, Wigan	19,152
2 March 1958	France	9–23	Great Britain	Test Match	(France) Stade Lesdiguieres, Grenoble	20,000
1 March 1959	France	25–8	Wales	Friendly	(France) Stade Municipal, Toulouse	25,000
14 March 1959	Great Britain	50–15	France	Test Match	(United Kingdom) Headingley, Leeds	21,948
5 April 1959	France	24–15	Great Britain	Test Match	(France) Stade Lesdiguieres, Grenoble	8,500
31 October 1959	France	19–20	Australia	1959–60 Kangaroo tour of Great Britain and France	(France) Parc des Princes, Paris	9,864
20 December 1959	France	2–17	Australia	1959–60 Kangaroo tour of Great Britain and France	(France) Stadium Municipal, Bordeaux	8,848

== 1960s ==
Date	Home	Score	Away	Competition	Venue	Attendance
20 January 1960	France	8–16	Australia	1959–60 Kangaroo tour of Great Britain and France	(France) Parc des Sports, Roanne	3,437
6 March 1960	France	20–18	Great Britain	Test Match	(France) Stade Municipal, Toulouse	15,308
26 March 1960	Great Britain	17–17	France	Test Match	(United Kingdom) Knowsley Road, St. Helens	13,165
11 June 1960	Australia	8–8	France	1960 France rugby league tour of Australia and New Zealand	(Australia) Sydney Cricket Ground, Sydney	49,868
2 July 1960	Australia	56–6	France	1960 France rugby league tour of Australia and New Zealand	(Australia) Brisbane Exhibition Ground, Brisbane	32,644
16 July 1960	Australia	5–7	France	1960 France rugby league tour of Australia and New Zealand	(Australia) Sydney Cricket Ground, Sydney	29,127
23 July 1960	New Zealand	9–2	France	1960 France rugby league tour of Australia and New Zealand	(New Zealand) Carlaw Park, Auckland	17,914
3 August 1960	New Zealand Māori	12–23	France	1960 France rugby league tour of Australia and New Zealand	(New Zealand) Rotorua International Stadium, Rotorua	5,044
6 August 1960	New Zealand	9–3	France	1960 France rugby league tour of Australia and New Zealand	(New Zealand) Carlaw Park, Auckland	14,007
24 September 1960	Australia	13–12	France	1960 Rugby League World Cup	(United Kingdom) Central Park, Wigan	20,278
1 October 1960	Great Britain	33–7	France	1960 Rugby League World Cup	(United Kingdom) Station Road, Swinton	22,293
8 October 1960	France	0–9	New Zealand	1960 Rugby League World Cup	(United Kingdom) Central Park, Wigan	2,876
11 December 1960	France	10–21	Great Britain	Test Match	(France) Stadium Municipal, Bordeaux	5,127
28 January 1961	Great Britain	27–8	France	Test Match	(United Kingdom) Knowsley Road, St. Helens	14,804
11 November 1961	France	6–6	New Zealand	1961 New Zealand rugby league tour of Great Britain and France	(France) Stadium Municipal, Bordeaux	2,375
19 November 1961	France	2–23	New Zealand	1961 New Zealand rugby league tour of Great Britain and France	(France) Stade Jean Laffon, Perpignan	9,020
9 December 1961	France	5–5	New Zealand	1961 New Zealand rugby league tour of Great Britain and France	(France) Stade de Paris, Paris	3,307
17 February 1962	Great Britain	15–20	France	Test Match	(United Kingdom) Central Park, Wigan	17,277
11 March 1962	France	23–13	Great Britain	Test Match	(France) Stade Gilbert Brutus, Perpignan	12,500
17 November 1962	England	18–6	France	Friendly	(England) Headingley, Leeds	11,099
2 December 1962	France	17–12	Great Britain	Test Match	(France) Stade Gilbert Brutus, Perpignan	12,500
17 February 1963	France	23–3	Wales	Friendly	(France) Stade Municipal, Toulouse	6,150
3 April 1963	Great Britain	42–4	France	Test Match	(United Kingdom) Central Park, Wigan	19,487
8 December 1963	France	8–5	Australia	1963–64 Kangaroo tour of Great Britain and France	(France) Stadium Municipal, Bordeaux	4,261
22 December 1963	France	9–21	Australia	1963–64 Kangaroo tour of Great Britain and France	(France) Stade Municipal, Toulouse	6,932
18 January 1964	France	8–16	Australia	1963–64 Kangaroo tour of Great Britain and France	(France) Parc des Princes, Paris	5,797
8 March 1964	France	5–11	Great Britain	Test Match	(France) Stade Gilbert Brutus, Perpignan	4,326
18 March 1964	Great Britain	39–0	France	Test Match	(United Kingdom) Hilton Park, Leigh	4,750
13 June 1964	Australia	20–6	France	1964 France rugby league tour of Australia and New Zealand	(Australia) Sydney Cricket Ground, Sydney	20,370
4 July 1964	Australia	27–2	France	1964 France rugby league tour of Australia and New Zealand	(Australia) Lang Park, Brisbane	20,076
18 July 1964	Australia	35–9	France	1964 France rugby league tour of Australia and New Zealand	(Australia) Sydney Cricket Ground, Sydney	16,731
25 July 1964	New Zealand	24–16	France	1964 France rugby league tour of Australia and New Zealand	(New Zealand) Carlaw Park, Auckland	10,148
1 August 1964	New Zealand	18–8	France	1964 France rugby league tour of Australia and New Zealand	(New Zealand) Addington Showgrounds, Christchurch	4,935
15 August 1964	New Zealand	10–2	France	1964 France rugby league tour of Australia and New Zealand	(New Zealand) Carlaw Park, Auckland	7,279
6 December 1964	France	18–8	Great Britain	Test Match	(France) Stade Gilbert Brutus, Perpignan	7,150
23 January 1965	Great Britain	17–7	France	Test Match	(United Kingdom) Station Road, Swinton	9,959
15 November 1965	France	14–3	New Zealand	1965 New Zealand rugby league tour of Great Britain and France	(France) Stade Velodrome, Marseille	30,431
28 November 1965	France	6–2	New Zealand	1965 New Zealand rugby league tour of Great Britain and France	(France) Stade Gilbert Brutus, Perpignan	9,000
12 December 1965	France	28–5	New Zealand	1965 New Zealand rugby league tour of Great Britain and France	(France) Stade des Minimes, Toulouse	7,000
16 January 1966	France	18–13	Great Britain	Test Match	(France) Stade Gilbert Brutus, Perpignan	7,255
5 March 1966	Great Britain	4–8	France	Test Match	(United Kingdom) Central Park, Wigan	14,004
22 January 1967	France	13–16	Great Britain	Test Match	(France) Stade Albert Domec, Carcassonne	10,650
4 March 1967	Great Britain	13–23	France	Test Match	(United Kingdom) Central Park, Wigan	7,448
17 December 1967	France	7–7	Australia	1967–68 Kangaroo tour of Great Britain and France	(France) Stade Velodrome, Marseille	5,193
24 December 1967	France	10–3	Australia	1967–68 Kangaroo tour of Great Britain and France	(France) Stade Albert Domec, Carcassonne	4,193
7 January 1968	France	16–13	Australia	1967–68 Kangaroo tour of Great Britain and France	(France) Stade Municipal, Toulouse	5,000
11 February 1968	France	13–22	Great Britain	Test Match	(France) Parc des Princes, Paris	5,500
2 March 1968	Great Britain	19–8	France	Test Match	(United Kingdom) Odsal Stadium, Bradford	13,992
25 May 1968	New Zealand	10–15	France	1968 Rugby League World Cup	(New Zealand) Carlaw Park, Auckland	18,000
2 June 1968	France	7–2	Great Britain	1968 Rugby League World Cup	(New Zealand) Carlaw Park, Auckland	15,760
8 June 1968	Australia	37–4	France	1968 Rugby League World Cup	(Australia) Lang Park, Brisbane	32,662
10 June 1968	Australia	20–2	France	1968 Rugby League World Cup	(Australia) Sydney Cricket Ground, Sydney	54,290
30 November 1968	Great Britain	34–10	France	Test Match	(United Kingdom) Knowsley Road, St. Helens	6,080
2 February 1969	France	13–9	Great Britain	Test Match	(France) Stade Municipal, Toulouse	7,536
9 March 1969	France	17–13	Wales	Friendly	(France) Stade de Paris, Paris	6,189
23 October 1969	Wales	2–8	France	1969–70 European Rugby League Championship	(England) The Willows, Salford	6,189
25 October 1969	England	11–11	France	1969–70 European Rugby League Championship	(England) Central Park, Wigan	4,568

== 1970s ==
Date	Home	Score	Away	Competition	Venue	Attendance
25 January 1970	France	11–15	Wales	1969–70 European Rugby League Championship	(France) Stade Gilbert Brutus, Perpignan	11,000
15 March 1970	France	14–9	England	1969–70 European Rugby League Championship	(France) Stade Municipal, Toulouse	6,587
25 October 1970	France	15–16	New Zealand	1970 Rugby League World Cup	(United Kingdom) The Boulevard, Hull	3,824
28 October 1970	Great Britain	6–0	France	1970 Rugby League World Cup	(United Kingdom) Wheldon Road, Castleford	8,958
1 November 1970	Australia	15–17	France	1970 Rugby League World Cup	(United Kingdom) Odsal Stadium, Bradford	6,215
12 November 1970	France	4–7	Australia	Friendly	(France) Stade Gilbert Brutus, Perpignan	14,700
7 February 1971	France	16–8	Great Britain	Test Match	(France) Stade Municipal, Toulouse	14,960
17 March 1971	Great Britain	24–2	France	Test Match	(United Kingdom) Knowsley Road, St. Helens	7,783
11 November 1971	France	11–27	New Zealand	1971 New Zealand rugby league tour of Great Britain and France	(France) Stade Gilbert Brutus, Perpignan	3,581
21 November 1971	France	2–24	New Zealand	1971 New Zealand rugby league tour of Great Britain and France	(France) Stade Albert Domec, Carcassonne	7,200
28 November 1971	France	3–3	New Zealand	1971 New Zealand rugby league tour of Great Britain and France	(France) Stade Municipal, Toulouse	5,000
6 February 1972	France	9–10	Great Britain	Test Match	(France) Stade Municipal, Toulouse	11,508
12 March 1972	Great Britain	45–10	France	Test Match	(United Kingdom) Odsal Stadium, Bradford	7,313
28 October 1972	France	20–9	New Zealand	1972 Rugby League World Cup	(France) Stade Velodrome, Marseille	20,748
1 November 1972	France	4–13	Great Britain	1972 Rugby League World Cup	(France) Stade Lesdiguieres, Grenoble	5,321
5 November 1972	France	9–31	Australia	1972 Rugby League World Cup	(France) Stade Municipal, Toulouse	10,332
9 December 1973	France	9–21	Australia	1973 Kangaroo tour of Great Britain and France	(France) Stade Gilbert Brutus, Perpignan	7,630
16 December 1973	France	3–14	Australia	1973 Kangaroo tour of Great Britain and France	(France) Stade Municipal, Toulouse	7,060
20 January 1974	France	5–24	Great Britain	Test Match	(France) Stade Lesdiguieres, Grenoble	4,100
17 February 1974	Great Britain	29–0	France	Test Match	(United Kingdom) Central Park, Wigan	9,108
19 January 1975	France	9–11	England	1975 European Rugby League Championship	(France) Stade Gilbert Brutus, Perpignan	7,950
16 February 1975	Wales	21–8	France	1975 European Rugby League Championship	(Wales) St Helens Rugby Ground, Swansea	23,000
2 March 1975	France	14–7	Wales	1975 Rugby League World Cup	(France) Stade Municipal, Toulouse	7,563
16 March 1975	England	20–2	France	1975 Rugby League World Cup	(England) Headingley, Leeds	10,842
15 June 1975	New Zealand	27–0	France	1975 Rugby League World Cup	(New Zealand) Carlaw Park, Auckland	2,500
22 June 1975	Australia	26–6	France	1975 Rugby League World Cup	(Australia) Lang Park, Brisbane	9,000
11 October 1975	France	2–48	England	1975 Rugby League World Cup	(France) Stadium Municipal, Bordeaux	1,581
17 October 1975	France	12–12	New Zealand	1975 Rugby League World Cup	(France) Stade Velodrome, Marseille	8,000
26 October 1975	France	2–41	Australia	1975 Rugby League World Cup	(France) Stade Gilbert Brutus, Perpignan	10,440
6 November 1975	Wales	23–2	France	1975 Rugby League World Cup	(England) The Willows, Salford	2,247
20 February 1977	France	13–2	Wales	1977 European Rugby League Championship	(France) Stade Municipal, Toulouse	5,827
20 March 1977	France	28–15	England	1977 European Rugby League Championship	(France) Stade Albert Domec, Carcassonne	12,000
29 May 1977	Papua New Guinea	37–6	France	Friendly	(Papua New Guinea) Lloyd Robson Oval, Port Moresby	14,000
5 June 1977	France	4–23	Great Britain	1977 Rugby League World Cup	(New Zealand) Carlaw Park, Auckland	10,000
11 June 1977	Australia	21–9	France	1977 Rugby League World Cup	(Australia) Sydney Cricket Ground, Sydney	13,231
19 June 1977	New Zealand	28–20	France	1977 Rugby League World Cup	(New Zealand) Carlaw Park, Auckland	8,000
15 January 1978	Wales	29–7	France	1978 European Rugby League Championship	(England) Naughton Park, Widnes	9,502
5 March 1978	France	11–13	England	1978 European Rugby League Championship	(France) Stade Municipal, Toulouse	6,000
26 November 1978	France	13–10	Australia	1978 Kangaroo tour of Great Britain and France	(France) Stade Albert Domec, Carcassonne	7,000
10 December 1978	France	11–10	Australia	1978 Kangaroo tour of Great Britain and France	(France) Stade Municipal, Toulouse	7,060
4 February 1979	France	15–8	Wales	1979 European Rugby League Championship	(France) Parc des Sports Et de l'Amitie, Narbonne	13,728
24 March 1979	England	12–6	France	1979 European Rugby League Championship	(England) Wilderspool Stadium, Warrington	5,004
14 October 1979	France	16–9	Papua New Guinea	Test Match	(France) Stadium Municipal d'Albi, Albi	4,500
28 October 1979	France	15–2	Papua New Guinea	Test Match	(France) Stade Albert Domec, Carcassonne	3,500

== 1980s ==
Date	Home	Score	Away	Competition	Venue	Attendance
26 January 1980	Wales	7–21	France	1980 European Rugby League Championship	(England) Naughton Park, Widnes	2,804
16 March 1980	France	2–4	England	1980 European Rugby League Championship	(France) Parc des Sports Et de l'Amitie, Narbonne	20,000
23 November 1980	France	6–5	New Zealand	1980 New Zealand rugby league tour of Great Britain and France	(France) Stade Gilbert Brutus, Perpignan	6,000
7 December 1980	France	3–11	New Zealand	1980 New Zealand rugby league tour of Great Britain and France	(France) Stade Municipal, Toulouse	3,000
31 January 1981	France	23–5	Wales	1981 European Rugby League Championship	(France) Parc des Sports Et de l'Amitie, Narbonne	4,120
21 February 1981	England	1–5	France	1981 European Rugby League Championship	(England) Headingley, Leeds	3,229
7 June 1981	New Zealand	26–3	France	1981 France rugby league tour of Australasia	(New Zealand) Carlaw Park, Auckland	12,200
14 June 1981	New Zealand Māori	5–14	France	1981 France rugby league tour of Australasia	(New Zealand) Davies Park, Huntly	3,200
21 June 1981	New Zealand	25–2	France	1981 France rugby league tour of Australasia	(New Zealand) Carlaw Park, Auckland	8,100
4 July 1981	Australia	43–3	France	1981 France rugby league tour of Australasia	(Australia) Sydney Cricket Ground, Sydney	16,277
18 July 1981	Australia	17–2	France	1981 France rugby league tour of Australasia	(Australia) Lang Park, Brisbane	14,000
23 August 1981	Papua New Guinea	13–13	France	1981 France rugby league tour of Australasia	(Papua New Guinea) Lloyd Robson Oval, Port Moresby	14,500
6 December 1981	Great Britain	37–0	France	Test Match	(England) The Boulevard, Hull	13,173
20 December 1981	France	19–2	Great Britain	Test Match	(France) Stade Velodrome, Marseille	6,500
31 July 1982	France	8–7	Great Britain	Friendly	(Italy) Stadio Pier Luigi Penzo, Venice	1,500
5 December 1982	France	4–15	Australia	1982 Kangaroo tour of Great Britain and France	(France) Parc des Sports, Avignon	8,000
18 December 1982	France	9–23	Australia	1982 Kangaroo tour of Great Britain and France	(France) Parc des Sports Et de l'Amitie, Narbonne	7,000
20 February 1983	France	5–20	Great Britain	1983 France vs. Great Britain rugby league series	(France) Stade Albert Domec, Carcassonne	3,826
6 March 1983	Great Britain	17–5	France	1983 France vs. Great Britain rugby league series	(United Kingdom) Boothferry Park, Hull	6,055
29 January 1984	France	0–12	Great Britain	1984 France vs. Great Britain rugby league series	(France) Parc des Sports d'Avignon, Avignon	4,000
17 February 1984	Great Britain	10–0	France	1984 France vs. Great Britain rugby league series	(United Kingdom) Headingley, Leeds, Leeds	7,646
1 March 1985	Great Britain	50–4	France	1985 France vs. Great Britain rugby league series	(United Kingdom) Headingley, Leeds	6,491
17 March 1985	France	24–16	Great Britain	1985 France vs. Great Britain rugby league series	(France) Stade Jean–Laffon, Perpignan	5,000
24 November 1985	France	0–22	New Zealand	1985 New Zealand rugby league tour of France	(France) Stade Vélodrome, Marseille	1,492
7 December 1985	France	0–22	New Zealand	1985–1988 World Cup	(France) Stade Gilbert Brutus, Perpignan	5,000
16 February 1986	France	10–10	Great Britain	1985–1988 World Cup	(France) Parc des Sports d'Avignon, Avignon	4,000
1 March 1986	Great Britain	24–10	France	Friendly	(United Kingdom) Central Park, Wigan	6,000
30 November 1986	France	2–44	Australia	1986 Kangaroo tour of Great Britain and France	(France) Stade Gilbert Brutus, Perpignan	6,000
13 December 1986	France	0–52	Australia	1985–1988 World Cup	(France) Stade Albert Domec, Carcassonne	5,000
24 January 1987	Great Britain	52–4	France	1985–1988 World Cup	(United Kingdom) Headingley, Leeds	6,567
8 February 1987	France	10–20	Great Britain	1987 France vs. Great Britain rugby league series	(France) Stade Albert Domec, Carcassonne	2,000
15 November 1987	France	21–4	Papua New Guinea	1985–1988 World Cup	(France) Stade Albert Domec, Carcassonne	5,000
24 January 1988	France	14–28	Great Britain	1988 France vs. Great Britain rugby league series	(France) Parc des Sports d'Avignon, Avignon	6,000
6 February 1988	Great Britain	30–12	France	1988 France vs. Great Britain rugby league series	(United Kingdom) Headingley, Leeds	7,007
21 January 1989	Great Britain	26–10	France	1989 France vs. Great Britain rugby league series	(United Kingdom) Central Park, Wigan	8,266
5 February 1989	France	8–30	Great Britain	1989 France vs. Great Britain rugby league series	(France) Parc des Sports d'Avignon, Avignon	6,500
19 November 1989	France	14–16	New Zealand	1989 New Zealand rugby league tour of France	(France) Stade Albert Domec, Carcassonne	3,500
3 December 1989	France	0–34	New Zealand	1989–1992 World Cup	(France) Stade Albert Domec, Carcassonne	4,028

== 1990s ==
Date	Home	Score	Away	Competition	Venue	Attendance
18 March 1990	France	4–8	Great Britain	1990 France vs. Great Britain rugby league series	(France) Stade Gilbert Brutus, Perpignan	6,000
7 April 1990	Great Britain	18–25	France	1990 France vs. Great Britain rugby league series	(United Kingdom) Headingley, Leeds, Leeds	6,554
27 June 1990	Australia	34–2	France	1989–1992 World Cup	(Australia) Pioneer Oval, Parkes	12,384
2 December 1990	France	4–60	Australia	1990 Kangaroo tour of Great Britain and France	(France) Parc des Sports d'Avignon, Avignon	2,200
9 December 1990	France	10–34	Australia	1989–1992 World Cup	(France) Stade Gilbert Brutus, Perpignan	3,428
27 January 1991	France	10–45	Great Britain	1989–1992 World Cup	(France) Stade Gilbert Brutus, Perpignan	3,965
16 February 1991	Great Britain	60–4	France	1991 France vs. Great Britain rugby league series	(United Kingdom) Headingley, Leeds	5,284
13 June 1991	New Zealand	60–6	France	1991 France rugby league tour of Australasia	(New Zealand) Carlaw Park, Auckland	7,000
23 June 1991	New Zealand	32–10	France	1989–1992 World Cup	(New Zealand) Addington Showground, Christchurch	2,000
7 July 1991	Papua New Guinea	18–20	France	1989–1992 World Cup	(Papua New Guinea) Danny Leahy Oval, Goroka	11,485
24 November 1991	France	28–14	Papua New Guinea	1989–1992 World Cup	(France) Stade d'Albert Domec, Carcassonne	1,440
16 February 1992	France	12–30	Great Britain	1992 France vs. Great Britain rugby league series	(France) Stade Gilbert Brutus, Perpignan	5,688
7 March 1992	Great Britain	36–0	France	1989–1992 World Cup	(United Kingdom) The Boulevard, Hull	5,250
22 March 1992	Wales	35–6	France	Friendly	(Wales) Vetch Field, Swansea	10,133
13 December 1992	France	18–19	Wales	Friendly	(France) Stade Gilbert Brutus, Perpignan	3,700
2 April 1993	Great Britain	72–6	France	1993 France vs. Great Britain rugby league series	(United Kingdom) Headingley, Leeds	8,196
7 March 1993	France	6–48	Great Britain	1993 France vs. Great Britain rugby league series	(France) Stade Albert Domec, Carcassonne	5,500
21 November 1993	France	11–36	New Zealand	1993 New Zealand rugby league tour of Great Britain and France	(France) Stade Albert Domec, Carcassonne	3,500
4 March 1994	Wales	13–12	France	Friendly	(Wales) Ninian Park, Cardiff	6,287
20 March 1994	France	4–12	Great Britain	1994 France vs. Great Britain rugby league series	(France) Stade Albert Domec, Carcassonne	7,000
26 June 1994	Papua New Guinea	29–22	France	1994 French rugby league Oceania tour	(Papua New Guinea) Lloyd Robson Oval, Port Moresby	5,000
6 July 1994	Australia	58–0	France	1994 French rugby league Oceania tour	(Australia) Parramatta Stadium, Sydney	27,318
9 July 1994	Fiji	20–12	France	1994 French rugby league Oceania tour	(Fiji) National Stadium, Suva	5,000
4 December 1994	France	0–74	Australia	1994 Kangaroo tour of Great Britain and France	(France) Stade de la Méditerranée, Béziers	5,000
15 February 1995	England	19–16	France	1995 European Rugby League Championship	(England) Gateshead International Stadium, Gateshead	6,103
5 March 1995	France	10–22	Wales	1995 European Rugby League Championship	(France) Stade d'Albert Domec, Carcassonne	6,000
9 June 1995	New Zealand	22–6	France	1995 France rugby league tour of New Zealand	(New Zealand) Ericsson Stadium, Auckland	15,000
16 June 1995	New Zealand	16–16	France	1995 France rugby league tour of New Zealand	(New Zealand) Palmerston North Showgrounds, Palmerston North	10,846
June 1995	Canada	32–72	France	Friendly	Montreal	
9 October 1995	Wales	28–6	France	1995 World Cup	(Wales) Ninian Park, Cardiff	10,250
12 October 1995	France	10–56	Western Samoa	1995 World Cup	(Wales) Ninian Park, Cardiff	2,173
5 June 1996	France	14–34	Wales	1996 European Rugby League Championship	(France) Stade d'Albert Domec, Carcassonne	4,300
12 June 1996	England	73–6	France	1996 European Rugby League Championship	(England) Gateshead International Stadium, Gateshead	6,239
13 May 1997	France	30–30	Ireland	Friendly	(France) Stade Robert Bobin, Bondoufle	4,250
9 July 1997	Scotland	20–22	France	Friendly	(Scotland) Firhill Stadium, Glasgow	2,233
6 December 1997	France	30–17	South Africa	Friendly	(France) Stade Fernand Fournier, Arles	?
4 November 1998	Ireland	22–24	France	European Tri Nations Championship	(Ireland) Tolka Park, Dublin	1,511
11 November 1998	France	26–22	Scotland	European Tri Nations Championship	(France) Stade Jean–Laffon, Perpignan	3,700
13 October 1999	France	20–28	England	Anglo–French Challenge	(France) Stade d'Albert Domec, Carcassonne	3,000
23 October 1999	England	50–20	France	Anglo–French Challenge	(England) The Boulevard, Hull	3,068
11 November 1999	France	80–8	Morocco	1999 Mediterranean Cup	(France) Stade Jean–Laffon, Perpignan	1,800
14 November 1999	France	38–24	Lebanon	1999 Mediterranean Cup	(France) Stade des Minimes, Toulouse	1,000
17 November 1999	France	10–14	Italy	1999 Mediterranean Cup	(France) Parc des Sports, Avignon	1,000

== 2000s ==
Date	Home	Score	Away	Competition	Venue	Attendance
28 October 2000	France	20–23	Papua New Guinea	2000 World Cup	(France) Stade Sebastien Charlety, Paris	7,498
1 November 2000	France	28–8	Tonga	2000 World Cup	(France) Stade Albert Domec, Carcassonne	10,288
5 November	France	56–6	South Africa	2000 World Cup	(France) Stadium Municipal d'Albi, Albi	7,969
12 November 2000	France	6–54	New Zealand	2000 World Cup	(England) Wheldon Road, Castleford	5,158
10 June 2001	New Zealand	36–0	France	2001 French rugby league tour of New Zealand and Papua New Guinea	(New Zealand) Ericsson Stadium, Auckland	4,500
17 June 2001	Papua New Guinea	16–27	France	2001 French rugby league tour of New Zealand and Papua New Guinea	(Papua New Guinea) Lloyd Robson Oval, Port Moresby	15,000
20 June 2001	Papua New Guinea	34–24	France	2001 French rugby league tour of New Zealand and Papua New Guinea	(Papua New Guinea) Danny Leahy Oval, Goroka	12,000
26 June 2001	France	56–16	Ireland	Friendly	(France) Stade Municipal d'Albi, Albi	2,006
3 July 2001	France	20–42	Scotland	Friendly	(France) Stade du Moulin, Lezignan	3,161
26 October 2001	France	12–42	Great Britain	Friendly	(France) Stade Armandie, Agen	10,000
2 November 2002	Lebanon	36–6	France	2002 Mediterranean Cup	(Lebanon) International Olympic Stadium, Tripoli	9,713
30 November 2002	France	10–36	New Zealand	2002 New Zealand rugby league tour of Great Britain and France	(France) Stade Aime Giral, Perpignan	6,500
19 October 2003	France	72–0	Morocco	2003 Mediterranean Cup	(Lebanon) International Olympic Stadium, Tripoli	
22 October 2003	France	120–0	Serbia	2003 Mediterranean Cup	(Lebanon) Beirut Municipal Stadium, Beirut	
25 October 2003	Lebanon	26–18	France	2003 Mediterranean Cup	(Lebanon) International Olympic Stadium, Tripoli	4,000
1 November 2003	Ireland	18–26	France	2003 European Nations Cup	(Ireland) Dalymount Park, Dublin	1,082
9 November 2003	France	6–8	Scotland	2003 European Nations Cup	(France) Parc des Sports, Avignon	2,200
16 November 2003	England	68–6	France	2003 European Nations Cup	(England) Halliwell Jones Stadium, Warrington	2,536
2 October 2004	France	46–6	Morocco	2004 Mediterranean Cup	(Lebanon) International Olympic Stadium, Tripoli	
5 October 2004	France	18–4	Serbia	2004 Mediterranean Cup	(Lebanon) International Olympic Stadium, Tripoli	
9 October 2004	Lebanon	42–14	France	2004 Mediterranean Cup	(Lebanon) International Olympic Stadium, Tripoli	
16 October 2004	Russia	10–58	France	2004 European Nations Cup	(Russia) Luzhniki Stadium, Moscow	2,000
30 October 2004	France	4–42	England	2004 European Nations Cup	(France) Parc des Sports, Avignon	4,000
11 November 2004	France	20–24	New Zealand	Friendly	(France) Stade Albert Domec, Carcassonne	8,000
21 November 2004	France	30–52	Australia	Friendly	(France) Stade Ernest Wallon, Toulouse	10,000
15 October 2005	France	80–0	Russia	2005 European Nations Cup	(France) Stade Fernand Fournier, Arles	1,000
30 October 2005	Georgia	0–60	France	2005 European Nations Cup	(Georgia (country)) Vake Stadium, Tbilisi	400
5 November 2005	France	38–16	Wales	2005 European Nations Cup	(France) Stade Albert Domec, Carcassonne	3,000
12 November 2005	France	12–44	Australia	Friendly	(France) Stade Aime Giral, Perpignan	7,913
18 November 2005	France	22–38	New Zealand	Friendly	(France) Stade Municipal, Toulouse	8,013
22 October 2006	England	26–10	France	Federation Shield	(England) Headingley, Leeds	5,547
29 October 2006	France	28–6	Samoa	Federation Shield	(France) Stade Benichou, Colomiers	2,700
5 November 2006	France	10–48	Tonga	Federation Shield	(France) Stade Pierre–Antoine, Castres	8,437
23 June 2007	Great Britain	42–14	France	Friendly	(United Kingdom) Headingley, Leeds	12,685
27 October 2007	France	46–16	Scotland	Friendly	(France) Stade Gilbert Brutus, Perpignan	7,000
3 November 2007	France	38–26	Papua New Guinea	Friendly	(France) Parc des Sports, Avignon	7,248
10 November 2007	France	22–16	Papua New Guinea	Friendly	(France) Stade Andre Moga, Bordeaux	4,500
17 November 2007	France	14–22	New Zealand	Friendly	(France) Stade Jean–Bouin, Paris	6,781
27 June 2008	France	8–56	England	Friendly	(France) Stade Ernest Wallon, Toulouse	8,326
26 October 2008	France	36–18	Scotland	2008 World Cup	(Australia) Canberra Stadium, Canberra	9,287
1 November 2008	Fiji	42–6	France	2008 World Cup	(Australia) Wollongong Showground, Wollongong	9,213
9 November 2008	France	10–42	Samoa	2008 World Cup	(Australia) Penrith Stadium, Sydney	8,028
13 June 2009	France	12–66	England	Friendly	(France) Stade Jean–Bouin, Paris	7,600
23 October 2009	England	34–12	France	2009 Four Nations	(England) Keepmoat Stadium, Doncaster	11,529
31 October 2009	France	12–62	New Zealand	2009 Four Nations	(France) Stade Ernest Wallon, Toulouse	12,410
7 November 2009	France	4–42	Australia	2009 Four Nations	(France) Stade Sebastien Charlety, Paris	8,656

== 2010s ==
Date	Home	Score	Away	Competition	Venue	Attendance
12 June 2010	England	60–6	France	Friendly	(England) Leigh Sports Village, Leigh	7,951
9 October 2010	France	58–24	Ireland	2010 European Cup	(France) Parc des Sports, Avignon	14,522
16 October 2010	France	26–12	Scotland	2010 European Cup	(France) Stade Municipal d'Albi, Albi	6,721
23 October 2010	France	11–12	Wales	2010 European Cup	(France) Stade Municipal d'Albi, Albi	10,413
21 October 2011	France	18–32	England	Friendly	(France) Parc des Sports, Avignon	16,866
29 October 2011	France	46–10	Scotland	2011 Autumn International Series	(France) Stade Gilbert Brutus, Perpignan	10,313
5 November 2011	Ireland	16–34	France	2011 Autumn International Series	(Ireland) Thomond Park, Limerick	3,100
16 June 2012	Wales	16–28	France	Friendly	(Wales) Racecourse Ground, Wrexham	1,464
20 October 2012	France	20–6	Wales	2012 Autumn International Series	(France) Stade Felix–Bollaert, Lens	11,278
3 November 2012	England	44–6	France	2012 Autumn International Series	(England) Craven Park, Hull	7,173
11 November 2012	England	48–4	France	2012 Autumn International Series	(England) Salford City Stadium, Salford	7,921
27 October 2013	France	9–8	Papua New Guinea	2013 World Cup	(England) Craven Park, Hull	7,481
1 November 2013	France	0–48	New Zealand	2013 World Cup	(France) Parc des Sports, Avignon	17,518
11 November 2013	France	6–22	Samoa	2013 World Cup	(France) Stade Gilbert Brutus, Perpignan	11,576
16 November 2013	England	34–6	France	2013 World Cup	(England) DW Stadium, Wigan	22,276
18 October 2014	Ireland	22–12	France	2014 European Cup	(Ireland) Tallaght Stadium, Dublin	1,428
25 October 2014	France	42–22	Wales	2014 European Cup	(France) Stadium Municipal d'Albi, Albi	5,225
31 October 2014	Scotland	22–38	France	2014 European Cup	(Scotland) Netherdale, Galashiels	1,432
22 May 2015	France	68–8	Serbia	Friendly	(France) Stade Municipal, Perpignan	
17 October 2015	France	31–14	Ireland	2015 European Cup	(France) Stadium Municipal d'Albi, Albi	4,681
24 October 2015	England	84–4	France	Friendly	(England) Leigh Sports Village, Leigh	8,380
30 October 2015	Wales	14–6	France	2015 European Cup	(Wales) Cardiff Arms Park, Cardiff	1,028
7 November 2015	France	32–18	Scotland	2015 European Cup	(France) Parc des Sports, Avignon	5,737
22 October 2016	France	6–40	England	Friendly	(France) Parc des Sports, Avignon	14,275
13 October 2017	France	34–12	Jamaica	Friendly	(France) Stade Gilbert Brutus, Perpignan	4,850
29 October 2017	France	18–29	Lebanon	2017 World Cup	(Australia) Canberra Stadium, Canberra	5,492
3 November 2017	Australia	52–6	France	2017 World Cup	(Australia) Canberra Stadium, Canberra	12,293
12 November 2017	England	36–6	France	2017 World Cup	(Australia) Perth Rectangular Stadium, Perth	14,744
7 October 2018	Serbia	2–54	France	Friendly	(Serbia) Belgrad	
17 October 2018	England	44–6	France	Friendly	(England) Leigh Sports Village, Leigh	5,144
27 October 2018	France	54–18	Wales	2018 European Championship	(France) Stade Albert Domec, Carcassonne	4,055
4 November 2018	Ireland	10–24	France	2018 European Championship	(Ireland) Morton Stadium, Santry	≈250
10 November 2018	France	28–10	Scotland	2018 European Championship	(France) Stade Albert Domec, Carcassonne	2,854
25 October 2019	Australia U-23	62–4	France	2019 Les Chanticleers tour of Australia	(Australia) Wollongong Showground, Wollongong	
30 October 2019	Western Rams	20–22	France	2019 Les Chanticleers tour of Australia	(Australia) Jock Colley Fields, Parkes	3,713

== 2020s ==
Date	Home	Score	Away	Competition	Venue	Attendance
23 October 2021	France	10–30	England	Friendly	(France) Stade Gilbert Brutus, Perpignan	6,000
19 June 2022	France	34–10	Wales	Friendly	(France) Stadium Municipal d'Albi, Albi	
17 October 2022	France	34–12	Greece	2021 Rugby League World Cup	(England) Keepmoat Stadium, Doncaster	4,182
22 October 2022	England	42–18	France	2021 Rugby League World Cup	(England) University of Bolton Stadium, Bolton	23,648
30 October 2022	Samoa	62–4	France	2021 Rugby League World Cup	(England) Halliwell Jones Stadium, Warrington	6,756
29 April 2023	England	64–0	France	Friendly	(England) Halliwell Jones Stadium, Warrington	8,422
25 September 2023	Serbia	10–78	France	Friendly	(Serbia) FC Obilic, Belgrade	
2 December 2023	Kenya	6–78	France	Two match series friendly	(Kenya) Impala Rugby Stadium, Nairobi	
5 December 2023	Kenya	4–108	France	Two match series friendly	(Kenya) Impala Rugby Stadium, Nairobi	
29 June 2024	France	8–40	England	Friendly	(France) Stade Ernest-Wallon, Toulouse	4,907
13 October 2024	France	C–C (Note: The French Rugby League Federation initially stated that the test series had been cancelled due to the NRL not released any Lebanese players. However the International Rugby League later confirmed this was false and that three key player to the Lebanon team were injured and organisers were concerned about ticket sales with star players absent.)	Lebanon	Two match series friendly	(France) Stade Pierre Balussou, Pamiers	
19 October 2024	France	C–C	Lebanon	Two match series friendly	(France) Stadium Municipal d'Albi, Albi	
22 October 2024	France	74–8	Ukraine	2026 World Cup Qualification – European Qualifiers	(France) Stade Albert Domec, Carcassonne	1,257
26 October 2024	France	48–6	Wales	2026 World Cup Qualification – European Qualifiers	(France) Stade Municipal, Saint-Estève	2,150
22 February 2025	Morocco	10–34	France	Friendly	(France) Parc des Sports, Avignon (Note: Played in France, but Morocco designated as home team)	
25 October 2025	France	36–0	Jamaica	2026 World Cup Qualification – Northern Hemisphere Playoff	(France) Stadium Municipal d'Albi, Albi	6,200
16 October 2026	Samoa	78–4	France	2026 World Cup	(Australia) Western Sydney Stadium, Sydney	13,174
24 October 2026	England	82–0	France	2026 World Cup	(Australia) Perth Rectangular Stadium, Perth	10,723
1 November 2026	France	20–24	Lebanon	2026 World Cup	(Australia) Western Sydney Stadium, Sydney	29,411

== Other matches ==
- 17 March 1934 English League 32–16 France, Wilderspool Stadium, Warrington 11,100. This game against an English representative side was the French team's first competitive match.
- 6 May 1935 English League 25–18 France, Headingley Rugby Stadium, Leeds 15,000
- 26 April 1936 France 8–5 Dominions Xlll, Stade Buffalo, Paris
- 21 March 1937 France 3–6 Dominions Xlll, Stade Municipal, Toulouse 16,000
- 1 November 1937 France 0–15 British Empire, Stade Buffalo, Paris 20,000
- 26 May 1949 France 23–10 British Empire, Stade Chaban–Delmas, Bordeaux
- 3 January 1954 France 19–15 Combined Nations, Stade de Gerland, Lyon
- 21 October 1956 France 17–18 English League, Stade Velodrome, Marseille 20,000
- 16 April 1958 English League 19–8 France, Headingley Rugby Stadium, Leeds 13,993
- 22 November 1958 English League 8–26 France, Knowsley Road, St Helens 16,000

== See also ==
- Rugby league in France
- France national rugby league team
- France women's national rugby league team
