= John McIntyre =

John McIntyre may refer to:

== Sportspeople ==
- John McIntyre (cricketer) (born 1944), New Zealand cricketer
- John McIntyre (racing driver) (born 1977), New Zealand racing driver
- John McIntyre (hurler) (born 1961), Irish hurling manager
- John McIntyre (ice hockey) (born 1969), Canadian ice hockey player
- John McIntyre (American rower) (born 1928), American rower who competed in the 1948 Summer Olympics
- John McIntyre (Canadian rower) (born 1945), Canadian rower who competed in the 1968 Summer Olympics
- John McIntyre (rugby league), Australian rugby league player

== Others ==
- John McIntyre (archbishop of Birmingham) (1855–1935), Roman Catholic archbishop of Birmingham
- John McIntyre (bishop of Gippsland) (1951-2014), bishop of the Anglican Diocese of Gippsland in Australia
- John McIntyre (cartoonist) (born 1954), American writer, director, and art director
- John McIntyre (copy editor), American copy editor and blogger
- John McIntyre (politician) (1832–1904), Australian businessman and politician
- John McIntyre (publisher), co-founder of RealClearPolitics
- John McIntyre (theologian) (1916–2005), professor of theology at the University of Edinburgh
- John J. McIntyre (politician) (1904–1974), U.S. Representative from Wyoming
- John J. McIntyre (bishop) (born 1963), American Roman Catholic bishop
- John T. McIntyre (1871–1951), American novelist
- Trapper John McIntyre, character from American media franchise M*A*S*H

== See also ==
- John Macintyre (1857–1928), Scottish doctor, pioneer in radiology
- John McIntire (1907–1991), American character actor
- John McIntire (pioneer), founder of the city of Zanesville, Ohio
- Johnny McIntyre (disambiguation)
