= Jack McIntyre (Australian footballer) =

Australian rules footballer

Personal information
- Full name: John Ward McIntyre
- Born: 24 September 1881; West Melbourne, Victoria
- Died: 19 April 1957 (aged 75); Flemington, Victoria

Playing career^{1}
Years	Club	Games (Goals)
1903	Essendon	4 (1)
1905–14	Essendon Association	148 (6)
- ^{1} Playing statistics correct to the end of 1914.

John Ward McIntyre (24 September 1881 – 19 April 1957) was an Australian rules footballer who played with Essendon in the Victorian Football League (VFL).

He later played with Essendon Association in the Victorian Football Association (VFA).
