= Edmond Brazès =

French writer

Edmond Brazès (1893 – 10 June 1980) was a French writer in both Catalan and French.

== Works ==
- La vie et l'oeuvre de Mossèn Esteve Caseponce (1948), essay
- L'ocell de les cireres (1957), poetry
- Històries del veïnat (1965), tale
- La neu (1970), play
