= Noël Brazès =

French rugby union player

Noël Brazès, born 18 December 1920 in Perpignan (Pyrénées-Orientales) and died 16 January 2010 in that same city, was a French rugby union player.

== Career ==
Born in Perpignan, Noël Brazès was the son of the writer Edmond Brazès from Céret. He joined the USA Perpignan rugby union club in 1935, and remained there as a player until 1952. He became a trainer for the same club during the season 1959-1960, and finally its president from 1975 to 1979.

On 26 March 1939, Noël Brazès played his first match in the France national rugby union team, of which he was the youngest member and while still passing the exams for his baccalauréat.

== Honours ==
- French rugby champion in 1938.
- French rugby championship finalist in 1939 and 1952.
