= John McIntyre (cricketer) =

New Zealand cricketer (born 1944)

Personal information
- Full name: John McLachlan McIntyre
- Born: 4 July 1944 (age 82); Auckland, New Zealand
- Batting: Left-handed
- Bowling: Slow left-arm orthodox

Domestic team information
- Years: Team
- 1961/62–1982/83: Auckland
- 1965/66–1968/69: Canterbury

Career statistics
| Competition | First-class | List A |
|---|---|---|
| Matches | 113 | 22 |
| Runs scored | 1,668 | 135 |
| Batting average | 17.93 | 13.50 |
| 100s/50s | 0/2 | 0 |
| Top score | 87* | 29 |
| Balls bowled | 25,164 | 1,131 |
| Wickets | 336 | 26 |
| Bowling average | 23.56 | 24.34 |
| 5 wickets in innings | 10 | 0 |
| 10 wickets in match | 1 | 0 |
| Best bowling | 6/84 | 3/10 |
| Catches/stumpings | 47/– | 3/– |
- Source: CricketArchive, 26 January 2017

John McIntyre (born 4 July 1944) is a New Zealand former cricketer. He played 113 first-class matches for Auckland and Canterbury between 1961 and 1983. McIntyre batted left-handed and was a handy slow left-arm orthodox bowler.
