= Stade des Ponts Jumeaux =

Rugby union stadium in Toulouse, France

- Le Wallon
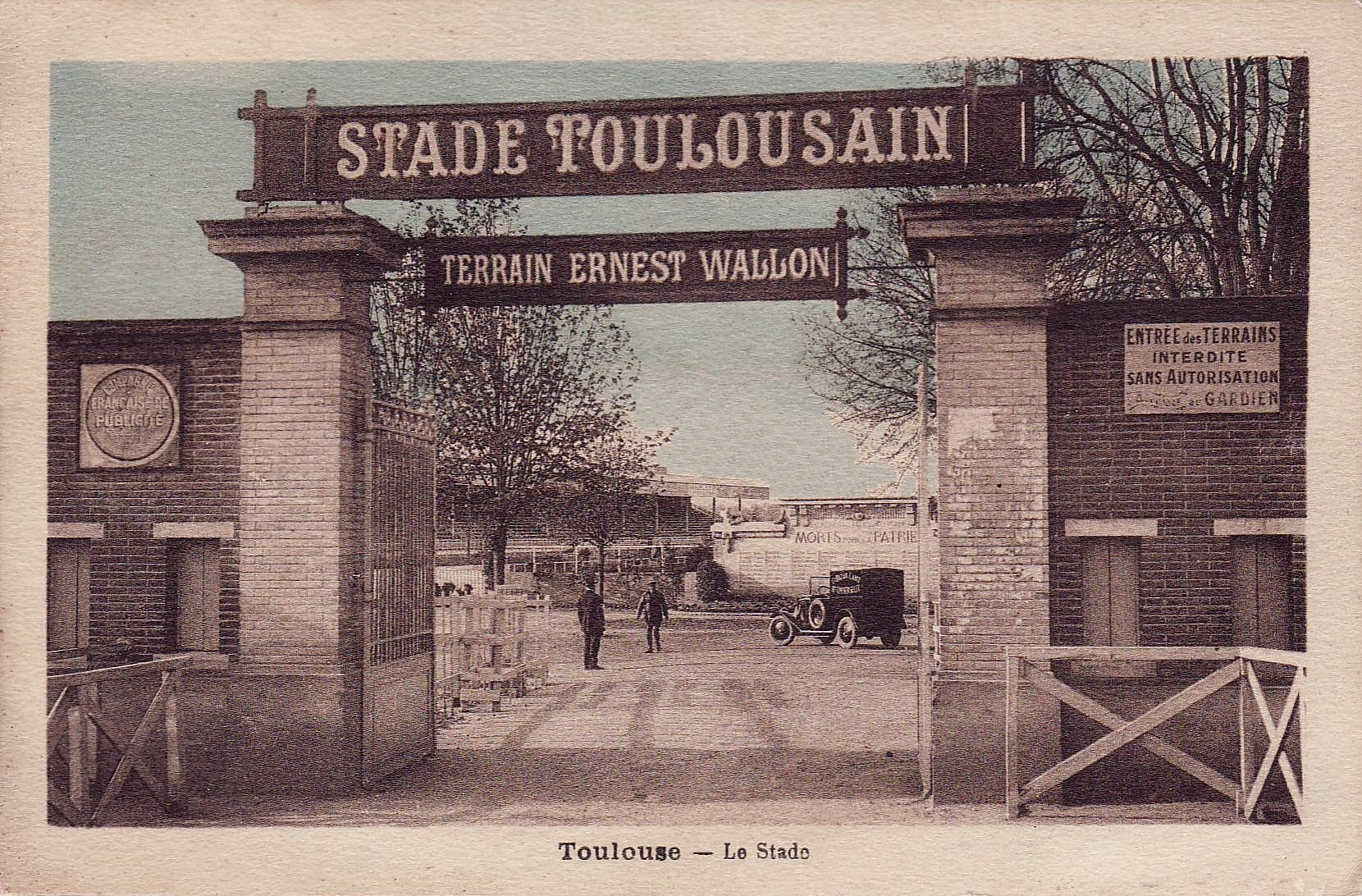
- Shown circa 1920
- Interactive map of Stade des Ponts Jumeaux
- Coordinates: 43.6128°N 1.417°E
- Owner: Stade Toulousain
- Capacity: 6,500
- Surface: grass

Construction
- Opened: November 24, 1907
- Closed: 1980
- Demolished: 1980

Tenant
- Stade Toulousain

The Stade des Ponts Jumeaux (the "Twin Bridges Stadium") was a rugby union stadium, inaugurated on 24 November 1907, in the Ponts Jumeaux district of Toulouse, south-western France. The land was purchased by the embryonic Stade Toulousain rugby team – with financial assistance from city notables – then headed by a law professor from the University of Toulouse, Ernest Wallon. The stadium, nicknamed Le Wallon, had a capacity of 6500 and hosted many internationals during its existence. In the early 1980s, the land on which the stadium stood was compulsorily purchased to make way for the Toulouse ringroad and the Stade Toulousain moved from the Ponts Jumeaux to a new stadium at Sept-Deniers, later renamed Stade Ernest-Wallon. One of the pavilions at Stade Ernest-Wallon is named after the Ponts Jumeaux.
