= Dinefwr Sharks =

Wales-based rugby league team (2006–)

Club information
- Full name: Dinefwr Sharks Rugby League Football Club
- Colours: Red and black
- Founded: 2006
- Exited: 2009
- Website: www.pitchero.com/clubs/dinefwrsharksrlc

Former details
- Ground: Tycroes RFC, Ammanford
- Competition: Rugby League Conference

Dinefwr Sharks RLFC were a rugby league side based in Ammanford, South-West Wales.

== History ==
West Wales Sharks were formed in the spring of 2006 and joined the Rugby League Conference Welsh Division West. The Sharks played eight games and there were heavy losses in the matches against Bridgend Blue Bulls but they ended their season with two wins against Aberavon Fighting Irish and Swansea Valley Miners.

In 2007, the Sharks moved to Furnace United RFC to play their home fixtures. The club played in the Rugby League Conference Welsh Premier division playing seven rounds from May to July. In the first match they lost to the Valley Cougars 12-74 but then won their next match 33-32 against the Cardiff Demons. But they then lost their remaining five matches including a tight 34-30 loss against Torfaen Tigers. Just one win meant that they had finished bottom of the league. Following interest shown by prospective junior sides at the letter stages of the 2007 season, the Sharks established junior sides Dinefwr Junior Shark and Swansea East Junior Sharks.

In 2009 the club, with a new voluntary board and a relocation to Tycroes RFC, changed their name to Dinefwr Sharks as this would be more relevant to their new playing location. The club made it to the final of the Welsh plate but lost to Newport Titans.

CPC Bears RL was formed in 2010, as the regional side for Carmarthenshire, Pembrokeshire and Ceredigion in the Welsh Premier Division with Dinefwr Sharks competing in the South Wales Championship. The South Wales Championship was given a re-structure following Dinefwr Sharks and three other West Wales clubs not fulfilling fixtures. They were replaced with newly formed Dyffryn Devils.

== Honours ==
The Sharks have had some representation at International level Wales 'A' Internationals - Alan Pope, Dai Norman, Mark Cooke and James Bannister. Wales u19s - Dan and Jonny Griffiths Wales Students - Christiaan Roets Junior International u16's - Daniel Davidson

== Results 2009 ==
- Sharks 0-44 Blackwood Bulldogs
- Sharks 70-6 Wild Boars
- Newport Titans 46-32 Sharks
- Bridgend Blue Bulls 56-5 Sharks
- Sharks 32-32 Neath Port Talbot Steelers
- Torfaen Tigers 52-44 Sharks
- Sharks 22-42 Cardiff Demons
- Valley Cougars 42-8 Sharks

Plate Final

Newport Titans 32 Dinefwr Sharks 24

== See also ==
- Rugby League in Wales
- Wales Rugby League
- List of rugby league clubs in Britain
