= 2018 Rugby League European Championship =

2018 European Championship
- Number of teams: 4
- Host countries: Wales; France; Scotland; Ireland
- Winner: France (8th title)
- Matches played: 6
- Attendance: 8,866 (1,478 per match)
- Points scored: 300 (50 per match)
- Tries scored: 52 (8.67 per match)
- Top scorer: (Wales) James Olds (40)
- Top try scorer: (France) Morgan Escaré (Wales) Rhys Williams (Wales) Josh Ralph (4 tries each)

The 2018 European Championship is an international rugby league tournament that took place in October and November 2018. Four teams competed in the tournament, which forms the top tier of European international competition, and the first stage of qualification for the 2021 Rugby League World Cup. The winner and runner-up will automatically qualify for the World Cup, while the third and fourth placed teams will enter the European play-off qualifying competition.

== Teams ==
The championship will be contested by the national teams of France, Ireland, Scotland and Wales. Wales are the defending champions having won the previous competition, the 2015 European Cup.

== Standings ==
The championship is a single round-robin tournament with two points awarded for a win and one point for a draw. The matches will take place over three consecutive weekends commencing 26 October 2018.

| Pos | Team | Pld | W | D | L | PF | PA | PD | Pts | Qualification |
|---|---|---|---|---|---|---|---|---|---|---|
| 1 | France | 3 | 3 | 0 | 0 | 106 | 38 | +68 | 6 | Qualification for 2021 Rugby League World Cup |
| 2 | Wales | 3 | 2 | 0 | 1 | 108 | 74 | +34 | 4 | Qualification for 2021 Rugby League World Cup |
| 3 | Ireland | 3 | 1 | 0 | 2 | 54 | 74 | −20 | 2 | Advance to Europe Repêchage for 2021 World Cup qualification |
| 4 | Scotland | 3 | 0 | 0 | 3 | 32 | 114 | −82 | 0 | Advance to Europe Repêchage for 2021 World Cup qualification |

Source: ERL

== Fixtures ==
27 October 2018
14:00 IST (UTC+01:00)

| Ireland | 36−10 | Scotland |
|---|---|---|
| Tries: Higginson (2), Bentley, McCarthy, McMahon, O'Donnell, Ryan; Goals: Finn (4/7) | Report | Tries: Glohe, Kavangh; Goals: Brierley (1/2) |

Morton Stadium, Santry
Attendance: 200
Referee: Tom Grant (England)

Notes:

- James Bentley, Lewis Bienek, Liam Byrne, Jack Higginson, Ronan Michael, Declan O'Donnell, Ethan Ryan, Michael Ward (all Ireland), Davey Dixon, Nick Glohe, Finn Hutchison, Sam Luckley, Murray Mitchell, Kieran Moran, and Luke Westman (all Scotland) made their Test debuts.

27 October 2018
18:00 CEST (UTC+02:00)

| France | 54–18 | Wales |
|---|---|---|
| Tries: Escaré (2), Marcon (2), Ader, Curran, Gigot, Miloudi, Navarette; Goals: Gigot (7/8), Albert (1/1), Curran (1/1) | Report | Tries: Kear, Olds, Ralph; Goals: Olds (3/3) |

Stade Albert Domec, Carcassonne
Attendance: 4,055
Referee: James Child (England)

Notes:

- Rhys Curran (France), Connor Davies, Curtis Davies, Sion Jones, and James Olds (all Wales) made their Test debuts, while Chris Vitalini made his debut for Wales after previously representing Italy.

2 November 2018
19:30 GMT (UTC+00:00)

| Scotland | 12–50 | Wales |
|---|---|---|
| Tries: Bell, Dixon; Goals: Brierley (2/2) | Report | Tries: Williams (3), Jenkins (2), Ralph (2), Butler, Evans; Goals: Olds (7/9) |

Netherdale, Galashiels
Attendance: 250
Referee: Ben Casty (France)

Notes:

- Craig Borthwick, Craig Robertson (both Scotland), Mike Butt, and Elliott Jenkins (both Wales) made their Test debuts.

3 November 2018
14:00 GMT (UTC+00:00)

| Ireland | 10–24 | France |
|---|---|---|
| Tries: McNally, Ryan; Goals: Finn (1/2) | Report | Tries: De Costa (2), Ader, Marcon; Goals: Gigot (4/5) |

Morton Stadium, Santry
Attendance: 250
Referee: Scott Mikalauskas (England)

Notes:

- Ed O'Keefe (Ireland) made his Test debut.
- France became the 9th team to qualify for the 2021 Rugby League World Cup.

10 November 2018
18:00 CET (UTC+01:00)

| France | 28–10 | Scotland |
|---|---|---|
| Tries: Escaré (2), Fages, Marion; Goals: Escaré (6/6) | Report | Tries: Dixon, Robertson; Goals: Brierley (0/1), Thomas (1/1) |

Stade Albert Domec, Carcassonne
Attendance: 2,854
Referee: Greg Dolan (England)

Notes:

- Gavin Marguerite (France), Hamish Bentley, Matt Hogg, Niall Sidney, and Dan Turland (all Scotland) made their Test debuts.

11 November 2018
15:00 GMT (UTC+00:00)

| Wales | 40–8 | Ireland |
|---|---|---|
| Tries: Bennion, Butler, Evans, Lloyd, Ralph, Williams; Goals: Olds (8/10) | Report | Tries: Grix, King; Goals: Finn (0/2) |

Racecourse Ground, Wrexham
Attendance: 1,257
Referee: Gareth Hewer (England)

Notes:

- Wales became the 10th team to qualify for the 2021 Rugby League World Cup.

== Media coverage ==
| Country or region | Broadcaster | Ref. |
|---|---|---|
| Australia | Fox League | |
| United Kingdom | BBC Worldwide | |
| France | viàOccitanie | |
