= Bridgend Blue Bulls =

Welsh amateur rugby league club, based in Pyle, Bridgend, Wales

Blue Bulls

Club information
- Full name: Blue Bulls Rugby League Football Club
- Colours: Blue
- Founded: 2003; 23 years ago & Resurrected 2014; 12 years ago
- Website: http://www.bluebulls.co.uk

Current details
- Ground: Pyle RFC
- Coach: Lee Harben-Jones
- Captain: Nathan Hawkins
- Competition: Rugby League Conference Welsh Premier

The Blue Bulls (known as Bridgend Blue Bulls RLFC between 2003 and 2012) are a rugby league side based in Pyle, Wales. They play in the Welsh Premier of the Rugby League Conference. They are the most successful amateur rugby league team in Wales, having won the Welsh Premier a record ten times in their two incarnations, as well as winning the Harry Jepson Trophy twice against teams from England, Wales and Scotland.

== History ==
The Blue Bulls were formed in 2003 and joined the newly formed Welsh Division of the Rugby League Conference. Since then, guided under head coaches Karl Hocking & Jon Purnell, they have won the league every year until 2008. In 2003 and 2004 they won all their games. In 2005 they lost just one, before drawing one game and losing one in the 2006 and 2007 seasons respectively.

In 2003 and 2005 the team also won the Harry Jepson Trophy, competing with teams from England, Scotland and Wales. In 2003 they beat Cardiff Demons, Aberavon Fighting Irish, Ipswich Rhinos and winning the final against Carlisle Centurions by 33–26 at Wilderspool Stadium, Warrington. In 2005, this time at the Brewery Field, they clinched the cup in a record-breaking 60–10 victory against Leeds Akkies. That match was seen by just over 1,150 people.

In 2007 they won the Welsh Grand Final at Brewery Field by beating the Newport Titans 24–18. The Blue Bulls were actually 6–0 down early on, but made an astonishing recovery to lead 24–6 at one point. They held their lead despite the Titans scoring two more tries.

The 2008 season saw Bridgend field a side that contained many new faces mainly youngsters that had not played league before. This led to more defeats than the club was used to and they eventually had to release their strangle hold on the Welsh title with it going to another team for the first time ever.

The 2009 season saw a marked improvement from the previous season, losing just one game during the regular season, they made it to the grand final against arch-rivals Blackwood Bulldogs at Virginia Park, Caerphilly, but fell at the last hurdle 38–22 in a bad-tempered encounter.

In the 2010 season, the Blue Bulls beat Cardiff Demons 28–56 to secure a home tie in the Welsh Premier Playoff Semi-Finals, after finishing second by points difference in the table, behind Valley Cougars, but went on to lose the final 46–44.

2011 saw the club crowned Welsh champions for the first time in 4 years after seeing off Valley Cougars in the final 48–24.

Despite a difficult start to the 2012 season which included heavy home defeats to Valley Cougars and Bonymaen Broncos, the Bulls surge in the second half of the season, a 22-all draw at Bonymaen (the only game that Bonymaen have ever failed to win) and win against the Cougars at Nelson RFC, saw the club reach their ninth final. The took on Bonymaen Broncos in the grand final, but were beaten 46–28.

The club didn't field a side in 2013 following the retirement of long serving team manager Simon Green. However the club was relaunched in 2014 at Pyle RFC as "Blue Bulls" and promptly won the Welsh Title in their first season back.

== Grounds ==
The club have played home games at a number of venues throughout the county, the original home for the first two years was at Coychurch Road, the former home of Bridgend Town F.C. They spent 2005 at the Brewery Field and were based at Porthcawl RFC between 2006 and 2012. In 2014 Pyle RFC was unveiled as their new home. They have also played home matches at Maesteg RFC and Llangeinor A.F.C. In 2020 the Bulls were due to start their campaign playing out of Kenfig Hill RFC but the season was put on hold for a short period and due to start later but subsequently cancelled due COVID-19.

== Season Tables ==
=== 2009 ===
Welsh Conference Premier 2009
#	Team	Pld	W	D	L	PF	PA	PD	Pts
1	Blackwood Bulldogs	8	8	0	0	328	90	+238	16
2	Bridgend Blue Bulls	8	7	0	1	302	103	+199	14
3	Valley Cougars	8	6	0	2	333	234	99	12
4	Cardiff Demons	8	5	0	3	220	167	53	10
5	Newport Titans	8	3	1	4	228	286	−58	7
6	Neath Port Talbot Steelers	8	1	2	5	146	262	−116	4
7	Torfaen Tigers	8	2	0	6	170	314	−144	4
8	Dinefwr Sharks	8	1	1	6	213	320	−107	3
9	St Clears Wild Boars	8	1	0	7	102	266	−164	2

==== Play Off Round 1 ====
August 1, 2009

Blackwood Bulldogs	48–34	Bridgend Blue Bulls
	(Report)

Glan-Yr-Afon Park, Blackwood

==== Play Off Round 2 ====
August 16, 2009

Bridgend Blue Bulls	48–28	Valley Cougars
	(Report)

South Road Ground, Porthcawl

==== Grand Final ====
August 16, 2009

Blackwood Bulldogs	38–22	Bridgend Blue Bulls
	(Report)

Virginia Park, Caerphilly
Referee: Martin Edwards

=== 2010 ===
Welsh Conference Premier 2010
#	Team	Pld	W	D	L	PF	PA	PD	Pts
1	Valley Cougars	10	9	0	1	556	256	+300	18
2	Bridgend Blue Bulls	10	9	0	1	536	246	+290	18
3	Cardiff Demons	10	6	0	4	296	320	−24	12
4	CPC Bears	10	2	0	8	188	494	−306	4
5	Newport Titans	10	2	0	8	258	433	−175	4
6	Blackwood Bulldogs	10	2	0	8	267	352	−85	4

==== Play Off Elimination Round ====
August 18, 2010

Bridgend Blue Bulls	56–4	Cardiff Demons
	(Report)

South Road Ground, Porthcawl

==== Grand Final ====
August 21, 2010

Valley Cougars	46–44	Bridgend Blue Bulls
	(Report)

Virginia Park, Caerphilly
Referee: Ian Curzon

== Other teams ==
The club runs junior sides at under-13, under-15 and under-17 levels in the Welsh Conference Junior League.

Supporters of the club formed a tag rugby outfit named Bridgend Blue Heifers in 2008.

== Grand Finals ==
- 2003: Won 42–8 against Averavon Fighting Irish
- 2004: Won 26–21 against Aberavon Fighting Irish
- 2005: Won 56–16 against Torfaen Tigers
- 2006: Won 22–10 against Cardiff Demons
- 2007: Won 24–18 against Newport Titans
- 2009: Lost 38–22 against Blackwood Bulldogs
- 2010: Lost 46–44 against Valley Cougars
- 2011: Won 48–24 against Valley Cougars 'A'
- 2012: Lost 46–28 against Bonymaen Broncos
- 2014: Won 33–30 against Aber Valley Wolves
- 2015: Won 34–30 against Aber Valley Wolves

== Honours ==
=== Club Honours ===
- Welsh Conference: 2003–2007, 2011, 2014 &2015
- Harry Jepson Trophy: 2003, 2005

=== Player Honours ===
- Bev Risman Medal: Karl Hocking (2003), Gareth David (2005)

=== Internationals in Current Squad ===
- Wales A: Craig Fox, Lee Harben-Jones, Nathan Hawkins, Gareth Howells, Tylon Mafi, Andy Milne, Huw Rosser, Owen Thomas, Nathan Trowbridge.
- Wales U20s: Huw Rosser.
- Wales U18s: Nathan Hawkins, Joe Symons.

=== Club Records ===
- Biggest winning margin: 84–1 against Swansea Bulls (Coychurch Road, Bridgend, 2003)
- Most points scored: 90–30 against CPC Bears (Porthcawl RFC, 22 May 2010)
- Biggest defeat: 68–18 against Blackwood Bulldogs (Blackwood RFC, 26 July 2008)

== Players earning international caps while at Bridgend Blue Bulls ==
- Allan Bateman won caps for Wales (RL) while at Warrington, Cronulla, and Bridgend Blue Bulls 1991...2003 14-caps 5(6?)-tries 20(24?)-points
- Kevin Ellis won caps for Wales while at Warrington in 1991 against Papua New Guinea, in 1992 against France, England, and France, in 1993 against New Zealand, in 1994 against France, and Australia, in 1995 against England, and France, in the 1995 Rugby League World Cup against France, Western Samoa, and England, while at Bridgend Blue Bulls in 2003 against Russia, and Australia, and in 2004 against Ireland, and won a cap for Great Britain while at Warrington in 1991 against France
- Karl Hocking won caps for Wales while at Bridgend Blue Bulls 2005(...2006?) 1(2?)-cap(s) (sub)
- Paul Morgan won caps for Wales (RL) while Bridgend Blue Bulls 2005(...2006?) (1-cap?) or 2-caps (sub)
- Nathan Strong won caps for Wales while at Bridgend Blue Bulls 2004 2004(...2005?) 2-caps (sub)
- Lenny Woodard represented Wales (RU) during the 1998 tour of Zimbabwe and South Africa in non-Test matches, and won caps for Wales (RL) while at Pontypridd RFC (RU), and Bridgend Blue Bulls 1999...2005 (4?)3-caps + 2-caps (sub) 3-tries 12-points

== Notable former players ==
- Allan Bateman - Wales & Great Britain RL, Wales & British & Irish Lions RU (status - retired)
- Lee Byrne - Wales, Ospreys & British & Irish Lions RU (status - retired)
- John Devereux - Wales & Great Britain RL, Wales & British & Irish Lions RU (status - retired)
- Kevin Ellis - Wales & Great Britain RL, Wales RU (status - retired)
- Lenny Woodard - Wales RL & Wales RU (status - retired)
- Christiaan Roets - Wales RL (status - active)

== See also ==
- Rugby League in Wales
- Wales Rugby League
- List of rugby league clubs in Britain
