= Newport Titans =

Newport Titans RLFC

Club information
- Full name: Newport Titans Rugby League Football Club
- Colours: Black and Amber
- Founded: 2004
- Exited: 2014
- Website: www.pitchero.com/clubs/newporttitans

Former details
- Ground: Newport Saracens RFC
- Competition: Rugby League Conference

Uniforms
Home colours

Newport Titans RLFC were a rugby league side based in the city of Newport, South Wales. Since 2013, they had been based at Newport Saracens RFC. They played in the Welsh Premier of the Rugby League Conference.

== History ==
Newport Titans RLFC were formed in 2004 as founder members of the new Rugby League Conference Welsh Division. The founding members found a home for the Titans at Pill Harriers RFC and appointed former international Dai Watkins as president. In their inaugural season Titans finished fourth in the table and were Welsh Shield runners-up. They won the Shield Final the following season.

The Titans reached the Welsh Grand Final in 2007 losing to Bridgend Blue Bulls.

They won the Welsh Shield in 2009 beating Dinefwr Sharks in the final.

Newport Titans dropped the 'Newport' preface from their name in 2011 when they moved to Machen RFC. The Titans remained here for two seasons.

The "Newport" preface was again used for the Titans on their return to Newport in 2013.

They reached the Shield Final of the South Wales Conference in 2014. but lost to Valley Cougars.

== Club honours ==
- Welsh Conference Shield winners 2005, 2009; runners-up 2004, 2014
- Welsh Conference finalists 2007.

== History ==
- Record League victory: 106-16 vs. Swansea Valley May 15, 2005 (first ever 100-pointer in the Welsh Conference).
- Record League defeat: 20-70 vs. Bridgend Blue Bulls July 9, 2005.

== Juniors ==
Titans' junior teams take part in the Welsh Conference Junior League. A new U13s Junior team is looking to be set up for the 2014 season.

== See also ==
- Rugby League in Wales
- Wales Rugby League
- List of rugby league clubs in Britain
