= Bonymaen Broncos =

Welsh rugby team

Club information
- Nickname(s): Broncos
- Colours: Red and Black
- Founded: 2011
- Exited: 2013

Former details
- Ground(s): Bonymaen RFC
- Coach: (Wales) Ian Brooks
- Captain: (Wales) Richard Brooks
- Competition: Rugby League Conference Welsh Premier

Uniforms
Home colours

Bonymaen Broncos were a Welsh rugby league team that participated in the Rugby League Conference Welsh Championship. Home games were played at Bonymaen RFC.

Bonymaen Broncos were founded in 2011. The club played its first game on Saturday 21 May 2011, when they played hosts to Neath Port Talbot Steelers. Broncos won the RLC Welsh Championship in their inaugural season.

In 2012, nine Broncos players were selected by the Wales Dragonhearts for their match against the Ireland Wolfhounds.

In October 2012, Bonymaen were drawn against Bradford Dudley Hill in the first qualifying round of the 2013 Challenge Cup. The result was recorded as a 24–0 loss.

== Club honours ==
- 2011 Rugby League Conference Welsh Championship title
- 2012 South Wales Premiership title

== See also ==
- Rugby League in Wales
- Wales Rugby League
- List of rugby league clubs in Britain
