= Blackwood Bulldogs =

Welsh defunct rugby league club

Club information
- Full name: Blackwood Bulldogs RLFC
- Founded: 2006; 20 years ago
- Exited: 2011; 15 years ago
- Website: http://www.blackwoodbulldogs.com

Former details
- Ground: Glan-yr-Afon Park
- Competition: Rugby League Conference Welsh Championship

Blackwood Bulldogs were a rugby league team based in Blackwood, Caerphilly, Wales. They played in the Welsh Championship of the Rugby League Conference.

== History ==
Blackwood Bulldogs were formed in the summer of 2006 at Glan-yr-Afon Park, the home of Blackwood RFC. They joined the Eastern Division of the Welsh Premier.

The Bulldogs first competitive match was at the Scott McRorie rugby league nines competition held at Glan-yr-Afon Park on 28 May 2006.

The Welsh Premier reformed as one division in 2007.

Blackwood won the Welsh Premier in 2009 beating Bridgend Blue Bulls 38 - 22 in the Grand Final.

Blackwood gained national prominence in 2010 when they reached the third round of the Challenge Cup and were featured twice on BBC’s Super League Show. They experienced a poor season in 2010 when they were unable to raise a team on several occasions.

In 2011, they failed to start the season in the South Wales Championship.

== Club honours ==
- RLC Welsh Premier: 2009

== Juniors ==
Blackwood Bulldogs' junior teams take part in the Welsh Conference Junior League.

== See also ==
- Rugby League in Wales
- Wales Rugby League
- List of rugby league clubs in Britain
