= CPC Bears =

Rugby league club in Carmarthen, Wales

Club information
- Full name: Carmarthen, Pembroke & Ceredigion Bears Rugby League
- Colours: Gold, red & green
- Founded: 2010
- Website: www.pitchero.com/clubs/cpcbearsrl

Current details
- Ground: Athletic Park, Johnstown, Carmarthen
- Competition: Rugby League Conference Premier Wales

CPC Bears were a rugby league club based in Carmarthen and were the regional side for Carmarthenshire, Pembrokeshire and Ceredigion. They played in the Welsh Premier Division of the Rugby League Conference.

== History ==
West Wales Sharks were formed in the spring of 2006 and joined the Rugby League Conference. They became the Dinefwr Sharks for the 2009 season. West Wales Wild Boars joined the Conference in 2009.

CPC Bears RL was formed in 2010, as the regional side for Carmarthenshire, Pembrokeshire and Ceredigion in the Welsh Premier Division with Dinefwr Sharks and West Wales Wild Boars competing in the Championship.

In 2011, CPC Bears were in the Premier division of the Welsh Rugby League Conference, but failed to complete the 2011 season and subsequently folded.

== Juniors ==
CPC Bears' junior teams take part in the Welsh Conference Junior League and Gillette National Youth League.

== See also ==
- Rugby League in Wales
- Wales Rugby League
- List of rugby league clubs in Britain
