= Paul Morgan (rugby, born 1974) =

Wales international rugby league & union footballer, coach & cricketer

Personal information
- Born: 3 October 1974; Pencoed, Bridgend, Wales
- Died: 12 January 2015 (aged 40)

Playing information

Rugby union
- Position: Centre
Club
Years	Team	Pld	T	G	FG	P
<1995–95	Pencoed RFC
1995–99	London Welsh RFC
1999	Whitland RFC
2000–02	Aberavon RFC	91	30
2002	Llanharan RFC
2002–04	Aberavon RFC
2005	Maesteg RFC	8
2007	Bridgend Ravens
2007–09	Pencoed RFC
	Total	99	30	0	0	0

Rugby league
- Position: Wing, Centre
Club
Years	Team	Pld	T	G	FG	P
2003–04	Aberavon Fighting Irish
2005	Bridgend Blue Bulls
2006	Celtic Crusaders	30	16			64
2007–08	Bridgend Blue Bulls
	Total	30	16	0	0	64
Representative
Years	Team	Pld	T	G	FG	P
2005	Wales	+2

Coaching information
Club
Years	Team	Gms	W	D	L	W%
2009–11	Neath Athletic RFC
2011–13	Aberavon Quins RFC
	Total	0	0	0	0

Paul Morgan (3 October 1974 – 12 January 2015) was a Welsh professional rugby union and rugby league footballer, rugby union coach and cricketer, born in Pencoed. He played club level rugby union (RU) for Pencoed RFC (two spells), London Welsh RFC (while at Brunel University), Whitland RFC, Aberavon RFC (two spells), Llanharan RFC, Bridgend Ravens, Maesteg RFC, as a Centre, representative level rugby league (RL) for Wales, and at club level for Aberavon Fighting Irish, Bridgend Blue Bulls (two spells), Celtic Crusaders, as a wing or centre, coached club level rugby union (RU) for Neath Athletic RFC, and Aberavon Quins RFC. and played cricket for Pencoed Cricket Club (captain).

== Background ==
Paul Morgan was born in Pencoed, Bridgend, Wales, he was the Executive Director at All Sports Protection, having been a Sports Risk Consultant at brightsidegroup, National Manager at April-UK Sports Division, Director at Morgans Health & Fitness Centre, and Gyms Co-ordinator at Bridgend County Borough Council, he was survived by spouse Heidi and offspring Tyler, Harry, and Madison.

== Playing career ==
=== International honours ===
Paul Morgan won caps for Wales (RL) while with Bridgend Blue Bulls in the 2005 European Nations Cup against Ireland (interchange/substitute), and France (interchange/substitute).

=== Club career ===
Paul Morgan made his début for Aberavon RFC, and scored two tries, against Walsall RFC at Talbot Athletic Ground on Sunday 20 August 2000, his last match for Aberavon RFC was against Neath RFC at The Gnoll on Wednesday 15 September 2004, he scored three tries for Bridgend Blue Bulls in the 60–10 victory over Leeds Akkies in the 2005 Harry Jepson Trophy at Brewery Field on Sunday 28 August 2005.

=== Later life ===
He died on 12 January 2015 aged 40.
