= Flintshire Falcons =

Welsh amateur rugby league club, located in Queensferry, North Wales

Club information
- Full name: Flintshire Falcons Rugby League Football Club
- Nickname(s): The Falcons
- Colours: Maroon; White
- Founded: 2012; 13 years ago
- Website: www.falconsrl.co.uk

Current details
- Ground(s): Deeside Leisure Centre, Flintshire, Wales
- Chairman: Mark Parry
- Competition: North Wales Conference
- 2011-12: 4th

Uniforms
Home colours	Away colours

Flintshire Falcons Rugby League Club is a rugby league team from the county of Flintshire, North Wales. They presently play in the Wales Rugby League North Wales Championship.

Flintshire Falcons Rugby League Club are a members-run club. They are based at Deeside Leisure Centre, Queensferry, Flintshire. There are currently over 40 playing and non-playing members varying in all ages. The club consists of a varied background of individuals, from school children and university students, through to business owners and volunteers.

== History ==
In 2012, Flintshire Falcons joined the inaugural North Wales Conference mid-season after Montgomeryshire Marauders folded. Founded by current Chairman Mark Parry and Treasurer Mike Roberts with players mainly drawn from union clubs throughout Flintshire. Since then the club has built its Junior sections and also an U18 section which finished 3rd in the debut season in the North West Counties Youth League Division 3.

They made it to the final of the North Wales 9s in 2013 but were beaten by Conwy Celts.

== Club honours ==
- 2012 North Wales Championship play-offs
- 2013 North Wales 9s runners-up
- 2013 North Wales Championship Runners Up
- 2014 North West Counties Youth League Division 3 3rd Place

== Club history ==
Past Club Chairpersons

- 2012–Present Mark Parry

Past Club Presidents

- 2012-Present Rhys Williams

Past Club Captains

- 2012-Present Keiron McCombe

Representative Honours

- 2012 Ollie Hughes Wales Dragonhearts
- 2012 Mitch Martin Wales Dragonhearts
- 2014 John Ketland Wales Dragonhearts
- 2014 Aled Davies Wales Dragonhearts
- 2014 Dylan Rowley Wales U18's

== See also ==
- Rugby League in Wales
- Wales Rugby League
- List of rugby league clubs in Britain
