= Wrexham Bradley Raiders =

Welsh amateur rugby league club, located in Wrexham, North Wales

Club information
- Full name: Wrexham Bradley Raiders Rugby League Football Club
- Nickname: Raiders
- Founded: 2011; 15 years ago
- Exited: c. 2015
- Website: www.pitchero.com/clubs/wrexhambradleyraiders

Former details
- Ground: Bradley Playing Fields
- Chairman: (Wales) Steve Jones
- Competition: North Wales Championship

Wrexham Bradley Raiders were a rugby league club based in Wrexham, Wales. They played in the North Wales Championship competition.

== History ==
Wrexham Bradley Raiders were formed in 2011 after discussions between the Welsh Rugby League, local coaches and rugby league supporters. After discussions with Wrexham Council it was agreed that they would train at Bradley Cricket Pavilion.

Wrexham Bradley Raiders joined the newly formed North Wales Conference in 2012. They finished bottom.

The club folded in c. 2015.

== See also ==
- Rugby League in Wales
- Wales Rugby League
- List of rugby league clubs in Britain
