= Lenny Woodard =

Wales dual-code international rugby footballer

Personal information
- Full name: Lenny David Woodard
- Born: 2 April 1976 (age 50) Croesyceiliog, Cwmbran, Wales

Playing information
- Height: 6 ft (183 cm) 0
- Weight: 15 st (210 lb; 95 kg) 7

Rugby union
- Position: Wing
Representative
Years	Team	Pld	T	G	FG	P
1998	Wales	2	1	0	0	0

Rugby league
- Position: Wing
Club
Years	Team	Pld	T	G	FG	P
2003–05	Bridgend Blue Bulls
2006	Celtic Crusaders	10	4	0	0	16
	Total	10	4	0	0	16
Representative
Years	Team	Pld	T	G	FG	P
1999–05	Wales	5	3	0	0	12

Lenny Woodard (born 2 April 1976) is a professional rugby footballer who played rugby union for Wales as a wing, and rugby league for Wales.

== Background ==
Woodard was born in Pontypool, Gwent, Wales. He went to Greenlawn Junior School, where he first played rugby. He received player of the year and was top scorer, scoring a hat-trick in county schools cup final at Rodney Parade. He also represented Pontypool Schools in the DC Thomas Cup final at Bridgend. He represented Gwent schools as well. He attended West Mon comprehensive school and was captain of his very successful year team and was captain of the 1st XV when they beat Millfield School.

He left school with 7 As and 2 Bs from his GCSEs and attended Pontypool College gaining all As in his A-Level grades. He went on to study Human Movement studies at UWIC and went back in 2003 to gain a PGCE in Secondary Education. Whilst at UWIC he was selected for Wales under-21 for the 5 nations campaign in 1996, Wales Students rugby league v England and Great Britain students rugby league tour and test match v France, scoring a try in the test match in a narrow 10-4 win

He is also a WRU Level 3 coach

Woodard played professional rugby and scored as a wing in both the Heineken Cup and Challenge Cup for both Ebbw Vale and Pontypridd in the seasons 1997 through to 2001. Notable opposition played against at top European level included Saracens, Leicester , Bristol, La Rochelle, Toulouse, Ulster Edinburgh and Glasgow.

== International honours ==
Woodard represented Wales (RU) during the 1998 tour of Zimbabwe and South Africa in non-Test matches, and won caps for Wales (RL) while at Pontypridd RFC (RU), and Bridgend Blue Bulls (RL) 1999...2005 (4?)3-caps + 2-caps (interchange/substitute) 3-tries 12-points. He scored a hatrick of tries for Wales v Russia in 2003.

Woodard also played international touch rugby for Wales in the European Cup, scoring the winning try v Scotland.

Woodard also gained international honours in hockey for Wales at U15, U16 and U18 level.

Woodard represented Wales and went on to represent Great Britain Students in rugby league. He played for Swinton Lions and Hull Sharks in the late 1990s and Celtic Crusaders in 2006 season.

== Career records ==
On Friday 2 May 2003, Woodard scored a club record 7-tries for Pontypool in a 90–3 victory over Treorchy RFC. He scored three more tries against Aberavon RFC in the following game to reach a season tally of 44 tries (39 league tries and five in the Principality Cup) and earned the accolade of having Pontypool's best try aggregate since World War I, surpassing the 39-tries scored by David Bishop in the 1983–84 season, but less than the 55-tries scored by wing Tom Robbins in the 1913–14 season.

In October 2009, Woodard scored two tries for Newbridge RFC in the 37–31 league win at Rumney RFC to take him to 150 career tries.

He is the highest try scorer in Welsh league history, amassing 186 league tries. He also scored 16 tries in England (15 for London Welsh and 1 for Pertemps Bees (Birmingham and Solihull). This combined effort saw over 200 league tries and he was also a prolific scorer in cup rugby. He also holds Welsh League records for most tries in a match (7 v Treorchy 2003) and most league tries in a season (38 in 2002- 2003 with Pontypool)
