= Sion Jones =

Sion Jones may refer to:

- Sion Jones (cyclist), Welsh racing cyclist
- Sion Jones (rugby league), Welsh rugby league footballer
- Sion Russell Jones, Welsh singer and songwriter
