= Conwy Celts =

Welsh amateur rugby league club

Club information
- Full name: Conwy Celts Rugby League
- Colours: Light green, dark green, mauve
- Founded: 2007; 19 years ago
- Website: www.pitchero.com/clubs/conwycelts

Current details
- Ground: Colwyn Bay RFC
- Coach: Ray Caldwell; Paul Wagner
- Captain: Ed Weston
- Competition: North Wales Championship

Conwy Celts are a rugby league team based in Colwyn Bay. They play in the North Wales Conference.

== History ==
Conwy Celts were formed in 2007.

They joined the newly formed North Wales Conference in 2012 finishing second in the table. Conwy Celts beat top-of-the-table Prestatyn and Rhyl Panthers 48-26 in the grand final to be crowned the first ever North Wales Champions.

Conwy Celts started off the 2013 season by winning the North Wales 9s by defeating Flintshire Falcons in the final. They finished top of the league. Conwy Celts then went on to win the North Wales Conference Challenge Cup for second year in succession by beating Flintshire Falcons by 50 - 30 in the final played at CBRFC on 21 August 2013. Three Conwy Celts players, Lewis Stockton, Ian Marshall and Jordan Sheridan represented Wales Dragon Hearts against Scotland A at Eirias Park, Colwyn Bay on Saturday 24 August 2013. Wales won this match by 64 - 18. Jordan Sheridan scored three tries and Lewis Stockton one try.

== Honours ==
- North Wales Championship: 2012, 2013
- North Wales 9s: 2013

== See also ==
- Rugby League in Wales
- Wales Rugby League
- List of rugby league clubs in Britain
