= Rugby in Wales =

Two types of rugby are played in Wales - rugby league and rugby union.

Please see the separate pages for their sports' history.

- Rugby league in Wales
- Rugby union in Wales
