= Josh Ralph =

Josh or Joshua Ralph may refer to:

- J. Ralph, American composer
- Josh Ralph (athlete), Australian athlete
- Josh Ralph (rugby league), Wales international rugby league footballer
