= Dee Valley Dragons =

Rugby league club in Corwen, Wales

Club information
- Full name: Dee Valley Dragons RLFC
- Founded: 2011; 15 years ago
- Website: www.pitchero.com/clubs/deevalleydragons

Current details
- Ground: Dee Park, Corwen
- Coach: Mike Parry
- Competition: North Wales Championship

Dee Valley Dragons are an amateur rugby league team based in Corwen, North Wales.

== History ==
Dee Valley Dragons were established in 2011 by coach Mike Parry, they played a series of friendlies throughout their inaugural season and took their place in the North Wales Championship for the start of the 2012 season. One Dee Valley Dragons player; Dafydd Lloyd represented Wales Dragon Hearts against Scotland A at Eirias Park, Colwyn Bay on Saturday 24 August 2013. Wales won this match by 64 - 18.

== See also ==
- Rugby League in Wales
- Wales Rugby League
- List of rugby league clubs in Britain
