= Mark Rowley =

Mark Rowley may refer to:

- Mark Rowley (police officer)
- Mark Rowley (actor)
- Mark Rowley (rugby union)
