= Prestatyn and Rhyl Panthers =

Welsh amateur rugby league club, located in North Wales

Club information
- Colours: Red & white
- Founded: c. 2011
- Website: www.pitchero.com/clubs/prestatynrhylpanthersarlfc

Current details
- Ground: The Waen, Rhyl
- Competition: North Wales Championship

Prestatyn and Rhyl Panthers are an amateur rugby league team based in Rhyl, North Wales. They play in the North Wales Conference.

== History ==
Prestatyn and Rhyl Panthers won the North Wales 9s in 2012 and then joined the newly formed North Wales Conference finishing top of the table. However, they lost 48–26 against Conwy Celts in the grand final.

== Honours ==
- North Wales 9s: 2012

== See also ==
- Rugby League in Wales
- Wales Rugby League
- List of rugby league clubs in Britain
