= Mike Butt =

Wales international rugby league footballer

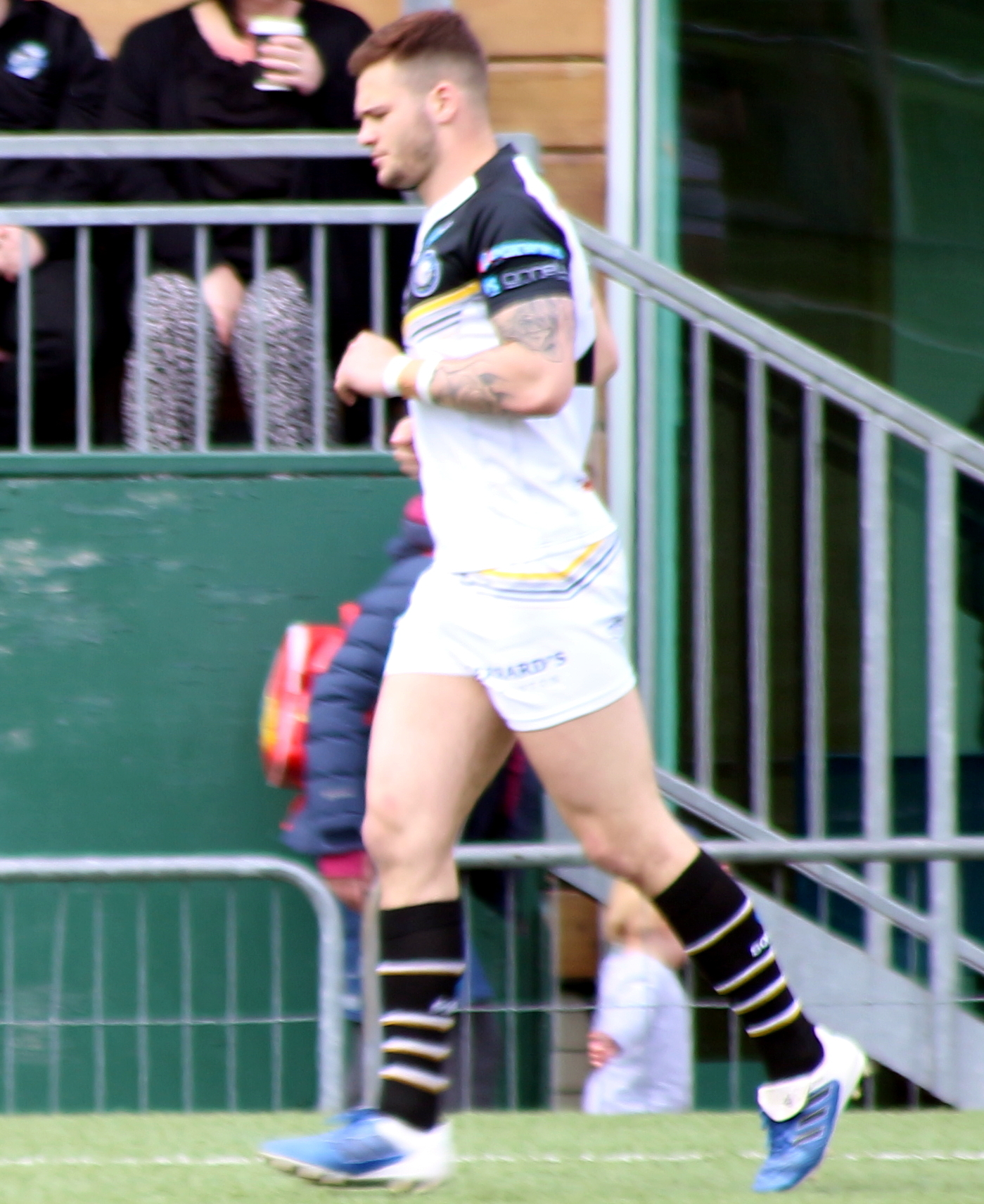

Personal information
- Full name: Michael James Butt
- Born: 6 May 1995 (age 31) Manchester, Greater Manchester, England
- Height: 5 ft 11 in (1.80 m)
- Weight: 12 st 8 lb (80 kg)

Playing information
- Position: Wing, Fullback
Club
Years	Team	Pld	T	G	FG	P
2015–23	Swinton Lions	171	94	0	0	376
2024–26	Widnes Vikings	76	39	0	0	156
2027–	Salford RLFC	0	0	0	0	0
	Total	247	133	0	0	532
Representative
Years	Team	Pld	T	G	FG	P
2018–	Wales	8	2	0	0	4
- Source: As of 26 October 2026

Mike Butt (born 6 May 1995) is a Wales international rugby league footballer who plays as a winger and fullback for Salford RLFC in the Championship.

== Background ==
Butt was born in Manchester, Greater Manchester, England. He is of Welsh descent through his grandmother.

He attended Manchester Metropolitan University and played rugby league for England Universities.

== Club career ==
=== Swinton Lions ===
In May 2015 Butt made his Swinton début against the Keighley Cougars.

He was given the Young Player of the Year award in 2017, and Player of the Year award in 2018.

Butt was the top Swinton try scorer for both the 2020 and 2021 seasons.

=== Widnes Vikings ===
On 2 Nov 2023 it was reported that he had signed for Widnes Vikings on a 1-year deal for 2024.

=== Salford RLFC ===
On 9 September 2026 it was reported he had joined Salford RLFC in the RFL Championship for 2027

== International career ==
In 2018 Butt made his international début for Wales against Scotland in the 2018 Rugby League European Championship.

Butt played for Wales at the 2019 Rugby League World Cup 9s.

In June 2022 Butt scored his first try at international level, when he crossed the line against France. In October 2022 he was named in the Wales squad for the 2021 Rugby League World Cup.
