= North Wales Men's League =

Rugby league of amateur teams

- Founded: 2012
- Country: Wales
- Number of clubs: 5
- Level on pyramid: 5
- Domestic cup: Challenge Cup
- Current champions: Conwy Celts
- Broadcaster(s): none

The North Wales Men's League is a summer rugby league competition for amateur teams in North Wales and Mid Wales. The competition was formed in 2012 as the North Wales Conference following the restructuring of amateur rugby league in Great Britain.

== History ==
The North Wales Conference was founded in 2012.

Prior to this, the only North Welsh rugby league team was Super League side Celtic Crusaders, who in 2010 moved from Bridgend to Wrexham.

The inaugural 2012 competition consisted of Conwy Celts, Dee Valley Dragons, Montgomeryshire Marauders, Prestatyn and Rhyl Panthers and Wrexham Bradley Raiders. Montgomeryshire Marauders folded mid-season and were replaced by Flintshire Falcons. The grand final was fought out between the top two sides: Conwy Celts and Prestatyn and Rhyl Panthers with the Celts running out 48–26 winners to be crowned the first North Wales Champions.

From 2023 North Wales Conference teams are able to qualify for the Challenge Cup through a playoff with the winners of the South Wales Premiership.

== Position in Pyramid ==
The North Wales Conference is part of tier five of the British rugby league system. Above the North Wales Conference is the National Conference League and Conference League South, the highest level of amateur rugby league in the UK.

- 1: Super League
- 2: Championship
- 3: League 1
- 4: National Conference League/Conference League South
- 5: North Wales Men's League

== Clubs ==
As of 2023: Bangor Buffaloes, Clwyd Cobras, Conwy Celts, Flintshire Falcons, Wrexham Crusaders.

As of 2021: Conwy Celts, Flintshire Falcons, Môn Knights, Wrexham Crusaders.

== Winners ==
- 2012: Conwy Celts 48–26 Prestatyn and Rhyl Panthers
- 2013: Conwy Celts 50–40 Flintshire Falcons
- 2014: ????
- 2015: ????
- 2016: ????
- 2017: ????
- 2018: ????
- 2019: ????
- 2020: ????
- 2021: ????
- 2022: Flintshire Falcons 24–22 Conwy Celts
- 2023: ????

=== 9s ===
- 2010: Rhyl Exiles
- 2011: No event
- 2012: Prestatyn and Rhyl Panthers
- 2013: Conwy Celts

== See also ==
- Rugby League in Wales
- Wales Rugby League
