= 1995 Rugby League World Cup knockout stage =

The 1995 Rugby League World Cup knockout stage took place after the group stage of the 1995 Rugby League World Cup and culminated in the 1995 Rugby League World Cup final.

The Semi-finals consisted of four teams; 1st and 2nd from Group A, 1st from Group B and 1st from Group C.

== Bracket ==
Semi-finals
21 October – Old Trafford, Manchester; Attendance: 30,042
England	25
Wales	10
22 October – McAlpine Stadium, Huddersfield; Attendance: 16,608
Australia	30
New Zealand	20

Final
28 October – Wembley Stadium, London; Attendance: 66,540
England	8
Australia	16

== Semi-finals ==
=== England (A1) vs Wales (C1) ===
Inspirational Welsh captain Jonathan Davies announced his representative retirement following the match.

21 October 1995

England	25 – 10	Wales
Tries: Martin Offiah (2); Denis Betts; Andy Farrell; Paul Newlove; Goals: Andy Farrell (1/2); Bobbie Goulding (1/3); Field Goals: Bobbie Goulding (1)		Tries: Rowland Phillips Goals: Jonathan Davies (3/3)

Old Trafford, Manchester
Attendance: 30,042
Referee: Eddie Ward (Australia)
Player of the Match: Bobbie Goulding

England	Wales

FB	1	Kris Radlinski
RW	2	Jason Robinson
RC	3	Nick Pinkney
LC	4	Paul Newlove
LW	5	Martin Offiah
FE	6	Tony Smith
HB	7	Bobbie Goulding
PR	8	Karl Harrison
HK	9	Lee Jackson
PR	10	Andy Platt
SR	11	Denis Betts (c)
SR	12	Phil Clarke
LK	13	Andy Farrell
Substitutions:
IC	14	Mick Cassidy
IC	15	Simon Haughton
IC	16	Dean Sampson
IC	17
Coach:
(England) Phil Larder

FB	1	Iestyn Harris
RW	2	John Devereux
RC	3	Allan Bateman
LC	4	Scott Gibbs
LW	5	Anthony Sullivan
SO	6	Jonathan Davies (c)
SH	7	Kevin Ellis
PR	8	Kelvin Skerrett
HK	9	Martin Hall
PR	10	Dai Young
SR	11	Paul Moriarty
SR	12	Scott Quinnell
LK	13	Richard Eyres
Substitutions:
IC	14	Mark Jones
IC	15	Keiron Cunningham
IC	16	Rowland Phillips
IC	17
Coach:
(Wales) Clive Griffiths

=== Australia (A2) vs New Zealand (B1) ===
After showing very little form in their group games, New Zealand almost produced a boilover against Australia in Huddersfield. The Kangaroos were leading 20–16 with just 3 minutes remaining before a Kevin Iro try leveled the scores leaving 'superboot' Matthew Ridge with a sideline conversion to send the Kiwis into the Final at Wembley. However, Ridge shanked the kick and the scores remained 20–all at the end of regulation time. In extra time, Terry Hill and Brad Fittler scored for the Australian's to give them a 30–20 win and put them into their 7th consecutive World Cup final. Steve Menzies crossed for 2 tries for Australia including a 70-metre run in the second half for his second try after being put into space by Andrew Johns. Menzies had enough pace to out-distance Manly-Warringah teammate Ridge and bump off Sean Hoppe 5 metres from the line to score.

22 October 1995

Australia	30 – 20 (ET)	New Zealand
Tries: Steve Menzies (2); Tim Brasher; Mark Coyne; Terry Hill; Brad Fittler; Goals: Andrew Johns (3/6)		Tries: Richie Barnett; Tony Iro; Kevin Iro Goals: Matthew Ridge (4/6)

Alfred McAlpine Stadium, Huddersfield
Attendance: 16,608
Referee: Russell Smith (England)
Player of the Match: Brad Fittler

Australia	New Zealand

FB	1	Tim Brasher
LW	2	Rod Wishart
RC	3	Mark Coyne
LC	4	Terry Hill
RW	5	Brett Dallas
SO	6	Brad Fittler (c)
SH	7	Geoff Toovey
PR	8	Dean Pay
HK	9	Andrew Johns
PR	10	Mark Carroll
SR	11	Steve Menzies
SR	12	Gary Larson
LF	13	Jim Dymock
Substitutions:
IC	14	Robbie O'Davis
IC	15	Matthew Johns
IC	16	Jason Smith
IC	17	Nik Kosef
Coach:
(Australia) Bob Fulton

FB	1	Matthew Ridge (c)
RW	2	Sean Hoppe
LC	3	Richie Blackmore
RC	4	Kevin Iro
LW	5	Richie Barnett
FE	6	Tony Kemp
HB	7	Stacey Jones
PR	8	John Lomax
HK	9	Henry Paul
PR	10	Jason Lowrie
SR	11	Stephen Kearney
SR	12	Quentin Pongia
LF	13	Mark Horo
Substitutions:
IC	14	Gene Ngamu
IC	15	Hitro Okesene
IC	16	Ruben Wiki
IC	17	Tony Iro
Coach:
(New Zealand) Frank Endacott

== Final: England vs Australia ==
28 October 1995

England	8 – 16	Australia
Tries: Paul Newlove Goals: Bobbie Goulding (2/3)		Tries: Rod Wishart; Tim Brasher; Goals: Andrew Johns (4/5)

Wembley Stadium, London
Attendance: 66,540
Referee: Stuart Cummings (England)
Player of the Match: Andrew Johns

England	Australia

FB	1	Kris Radlinski
RW	2	Jason Robinson
RC	3	Gary Connolly
LC	4	Paul Newlove
LW	5	Martin Offiah
SO	6	Tony Smith
SH	7	Bobbie Goulding
PR	8	Karl Harrison
HK	9	Lee Jackson
PR	10	Andy Platt
SR	11	Denis Betts (c)
SR	12	Phil Clarke
LF	13	Andy Farrell
Substitutions:
IC	14	Barrie-Jon Mather
IC	15	Mick Cassidy
IC	16	Nick Pinkney
IC	17	Chris Joynt
Coach:
(England) Phil Larder

FB	1	Tim Brasher
LW	2	Rod Wishart
LC	3	Mark Coyne
RC	4	Terry Hill
RW	5	Brett Dallas
FE	6	Brad Fittler (c)
HB	7	Geoff Toovey
PR	8	Dean Pay
HK	9	Andrew Johns
PR	10	Mark Carroll
SR	11	Steve Menzies
SR	12	Gary Larson
LK	13	Jim Dymock
Substitutions:
IC	14	Robbie O'Davis
IC	15	Matthew Johns
IC	16	Jason Smith
IC	17	Nik Kosef
Coach:
(Australia) Bob Fulton
