= Kieran Moran =

Scotland international rugby league footballer

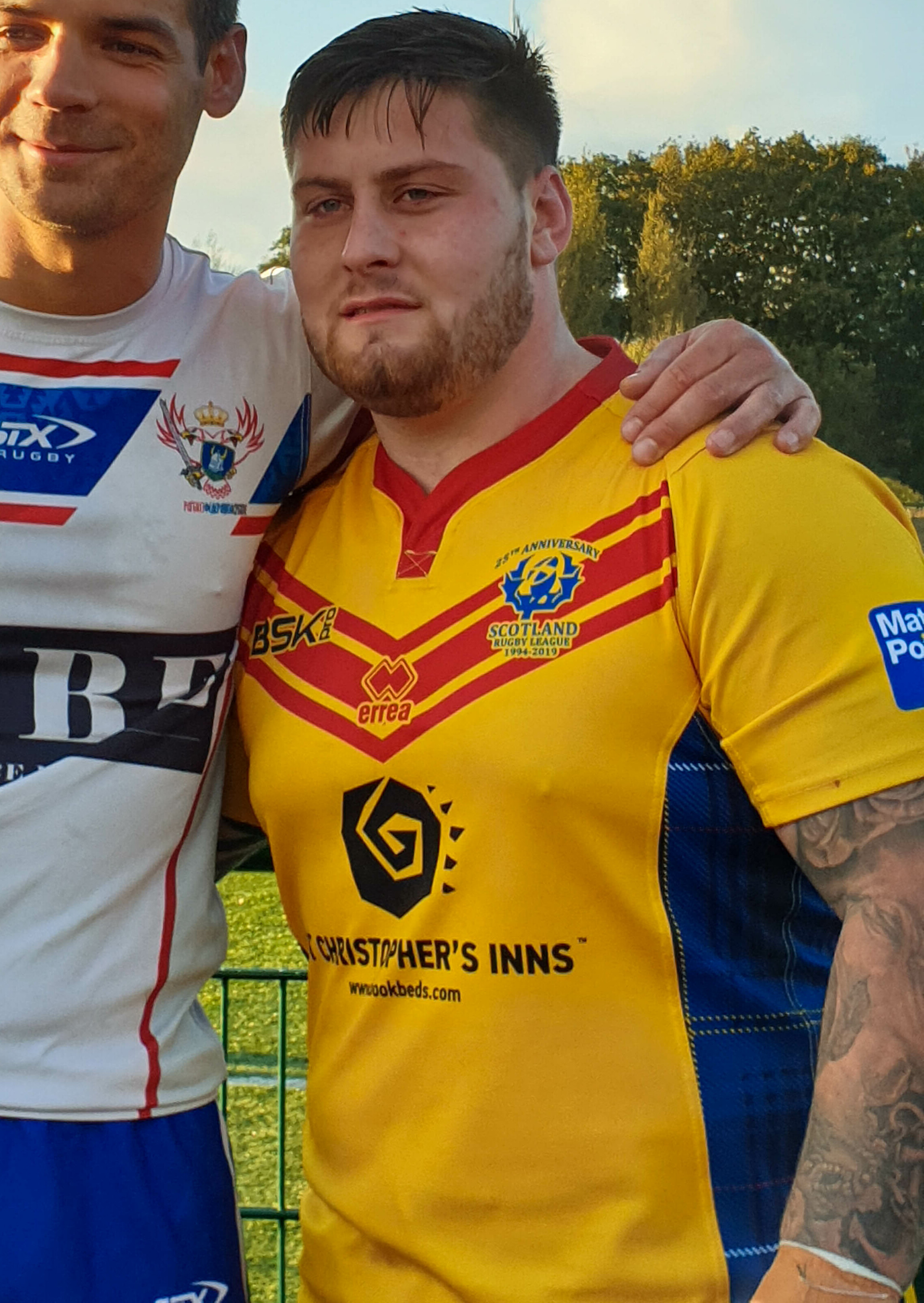

Personal information
- Born: 2 November 1996 (age 30) Kingston upon Hull, East Riding of Yorkshire, England

Playing information
- Position: Prop
Club
Years	Team	Pld	T	G	FG	P
2016–17	Hull Kingston Rovers	7	0	0	0	0
2016(loan)	→ Newcastle Thunder	3	0	0	0	0
2017(loan)	→ York City Knights	18	2	0	0	8
2018	Sheffield Eagles	9	0	0	0	0
2018(DR)	→ Hemel Stags	4	1	0	0	4
2018–21	Keighley Cougars	19	2	0	0	8
2022	Hunslet RLFC	10	1	0	0	4
2023–26	Midlands Hurricanes	41	1	0	0	4
2027–	Newcastle Thunder	0	0	0	0	0
	Total	111	7	0	0	28
Representative
Years	Team	Pld	T	G	FG	P
2018–26	Scotland	8	0	0	0	0
- Source: As of 12 November 2026

Kieran Moran (born 2 November 1996) is a Scotland international rugby league footballer who plays as a prop for Newcastle Thunder in the RFL Championship.

== Background ==
Moran was born in Kingston upon Hull, East Riding of Yorkshire, England.

== Club career ==
=== Hull KR ===
He began his professional career with home town club Hull KR. During his time with 'The Robins' he played just seven times in the senior side, making a debut performance off the bench against Widnes Vikings on 4 March 2016.

=== Newcastle Thunder ===
Moran was then loaned out to League 1 team Newcastle Thunder. Here, he made three substitute appearances, but failed to make much of an impact and swiftly returned to Hull.

=== York City Knights ===
After this loan spell, he was sent out to the York City Knights, who at the time were in financial trouble. The prop forward had a successful spell at York as he scored his first professional try against Rochdale in the Challenge Cup. He also scored another against Keighley Cougars in a 22–20 League 1 loss and went on to play a total of 18 games over the course of that season.

=== Sheffield Eagles ===
On 1 December 2017 Championship side Sheffield Eagles announced that Moran had become their sixth new signing ahead of their return to Sheffield. In 2018 he played for Hemel Stags on dual registration before joining Keighley part way through the 2018 season.

=== Newcastle Thunder ===
On 12 November 2026 it was reported that he had re-joined Newcastle Thunder in the RFL Championship

== International career ==
Moran was named in both Scotland squads for the 2016 Four Nations and 2017 World Cup but failed to make an appearance. He said, regarding the latter, "The World Cup was awesome, just getting out to Australia and being involved in the World Cup was maybe a once in a lifetime opportunity." His international debut came in the opening fixture of the 2018 Rugby League European Championship against Ireland where he came off the interchange bench in a 36–10 defeat.
