= Curtis Davies (rugby league) =

Wales international rugby league footballer

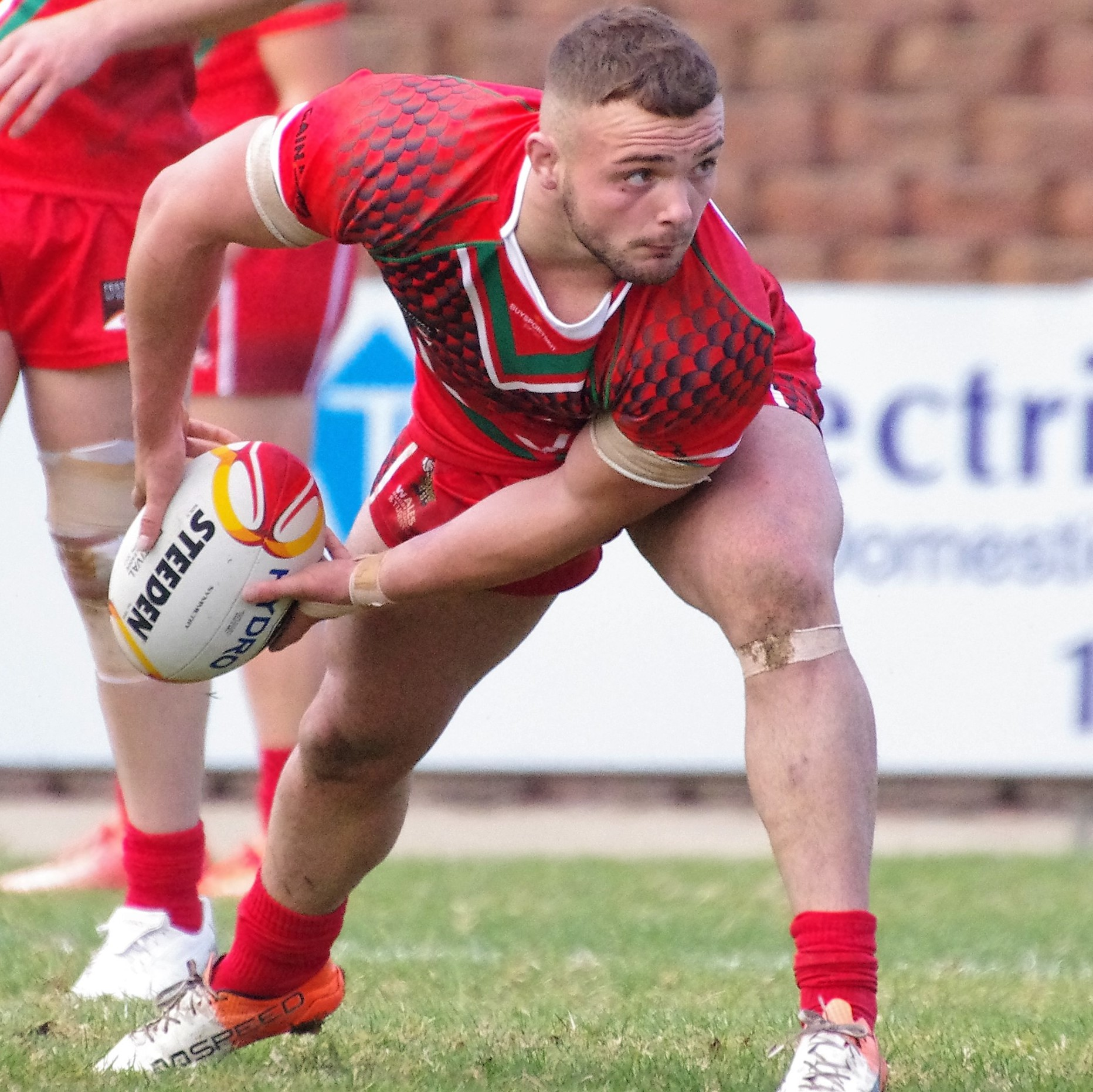

Personal information
- Full name: Curtis Lee Davies
- Born: 17 January 1997 (age 29) Swansea, Wales
- Height: 5 ft 8 in (173 cm)
- Weight: 13 st 8 lb (86 kg)

Playing information
- Position: Hooker, Scrum-half
Club
Years	Team	Pld	T	G	FG	P
2018–21	Halifax	16	1	0	0	4
2018(loan)	→ Newcastle Thunder	1	0	0	0	0
2021–22	Villeneuve XIII	8	0	0	0	0
2022	Workington Town	4	0	0	0	0
2022(loan)	→ Whitehaven	9	0	0	0	0
2023	Newcastle Thunder	30	1	0	0	4
2024	Dewsbury Rams	22	3	0	0	12
2025	London Broncos	27	0	0	0	0
2026–	Halifax Panthers	20	3	0	0	12
	Total	137	8	0	0	32
Representative
Years	Team	Pld	T	G	FG	P
2018–	Wales	9	0	0	0	0
- Source: As of 26 October 2026
- Relatives: Connor Davies (brother)

Curtis Davies (born 17 January 1997) is a Welsh professional rugby league footballer who plays as a hooker for the Wales at international level. He currently plays for Halifax Panthers in the RFL Championship.

== Background ==
His full-time job is a physical education teacher at Crossley Heath Grammar school, Halifax, West Yorkshire.

His twin brother Connor Davies also plays professional rugby league and has been capped internationally for Wales.

== Playing career ==
=== Youth Career ===
He started his rugby journey at under-7s playing for rugby union side Cwmtwrch before moving to Ystradgynlais RFC at under-9s, staying with them until under-18s. He began playing the 13-man code at his high school, Ysgol Gyfun Ystalyfera, playing under the tutelage of former Welsh league international Ioan Bebb.

At 14 he joined Neath Port Talbot Steelers playing rugby league in the summer and union in the winter. He was then chosen to join the South Wales Scorpion Academy at 15.

His talents earned him Welsh league caps at under 16s level and attracted the attention of northern scouts. Him and his brother were given the opportunity to further their league careers alongside their university studies in Leeds, joining Leeds Beckett University where he featured for the schools rugby league side.

=== South Wales Scorpions ===
After 2 years in the academy, Davies made his debut against Rochdale Hornets in the 2015 League 1 Cup. He featured 19 times for the side scoring 2 tries. He came off the bench in the Scorpions only win of the season against London Skolars in the 12th round of the regular season.

Halifax Panthers

While playing at the Students Four Nations he spoke to Martin Gonzalez going on the join Halifax's reserves side, spending a year with them before going to sign a professional contract in 2018 with the Championship side.

He made his professional debut for Halifax against the London Broncos in Round 7 of the Super League Qualifiers.

=== Dewsbury Rams ===
On 22 November 2023 he signed for Dewsbury Rams in the RFL Championship for 2024.

=== London Broncos ===
On 15 January 2025 he signed for London Broncos in the RFL Championship for 2025.

== International career ==
He was selected in the Wales 9s squad for the 2019 Rugby League World Cup 9s.
