= Josh Ralph (rugby league) =

Wales international rugby league footballer

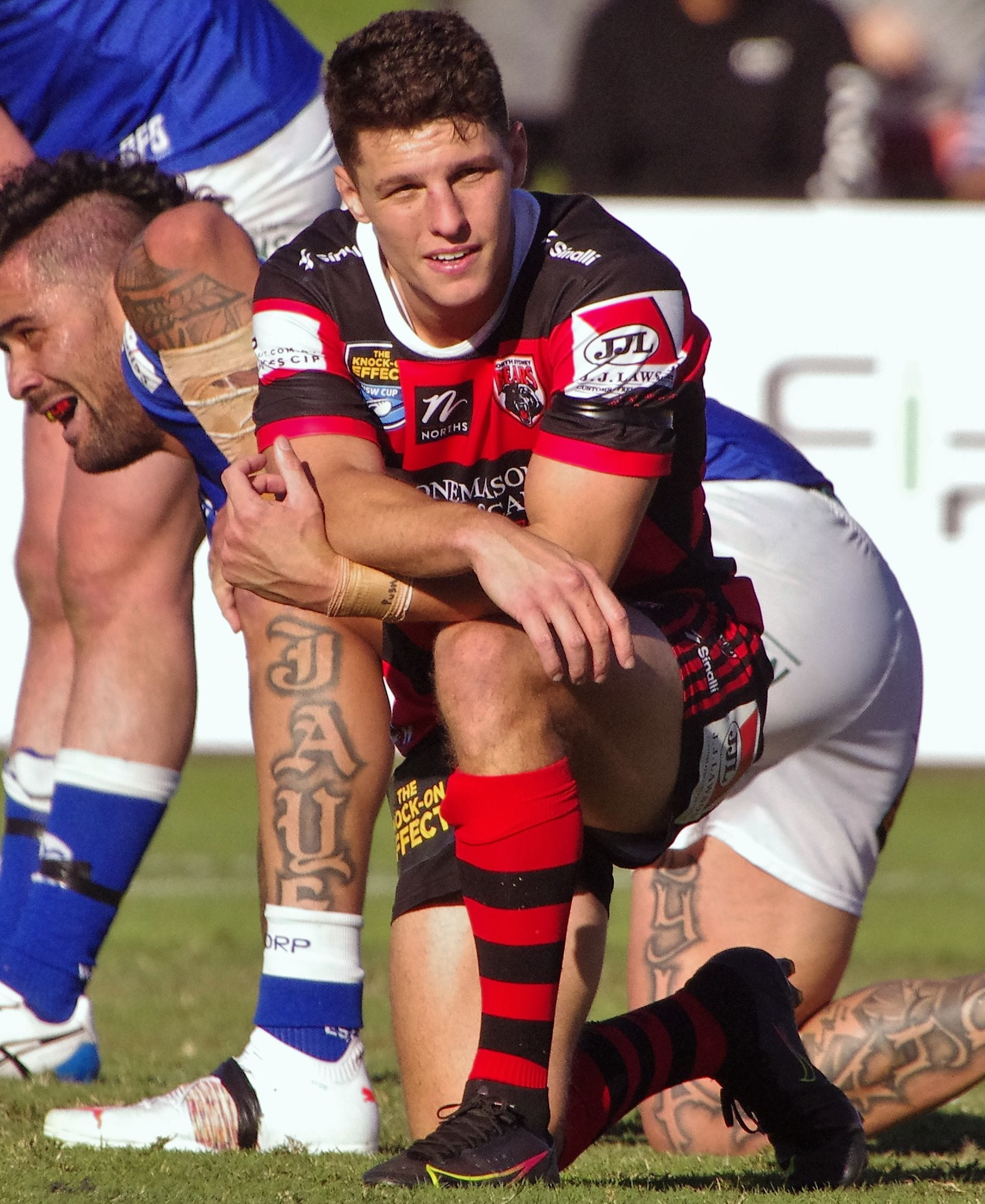

Personal information
- Full name: Joshua Ralph
- Born: 21 July 1997 (age 29) Southport, Queensland, Australia
- Height: 5 ft 9 in (1.76 m)
- Weight: 12 st 11 lb (81 kg)

Playing information
- Position: Scrum-half
Club
Years	Team	Pld	T	G	FG	P
2023	Toulouse Olympique	23	15	0	0	60
Representative
Years	Team	Pld	T	G	FG	P
2017–	Wales	9	4	0	0	16
- Source: As of 21 January 2024

Joshua Ralph (born 21 July 1997) is a Wales international rugby league footballer who last played as a scrum-half for Toulouse Olympique and for St. George Illawarra Dragons in the NSW Cup.

== Background ==
He was born on the Gold Coast, Queensland, Australia.

Ralph played for junior clubs Runaway Bay Seagulls and Nerang Roosters.

== Playing career ==
He represented the Queensland under-15s before playing two seasons for the Gold Coast Titans in the Holden Cup. He then represented the Queensland under-18s before signing with the Newcastle Knights for the 2017 Holden Cup (Under-20s).

Near the end of the 2017 season he rejoined the Tweed Heads Seagulls in the Queensland Cup.

He was named in the Welsh squad for the 2017 Rugby League World Cup, qualifying through his Welsh grandmother.

Ralph was also named in the Wales squad for the 2021 Rugby League World Cup.

In December 2022, Ralph signed for Toulouse Olympique in the RFL Championship for the 2023 season. Toulouse reached the Grand Final, but lost to London Broncos thereby missing out on promotion to the Super League.

In the 2024 season, Ralph joined St George Illawarra Dragons playing for their NSW Cup team.
