= Connor Davies =

Wales international rugby league player

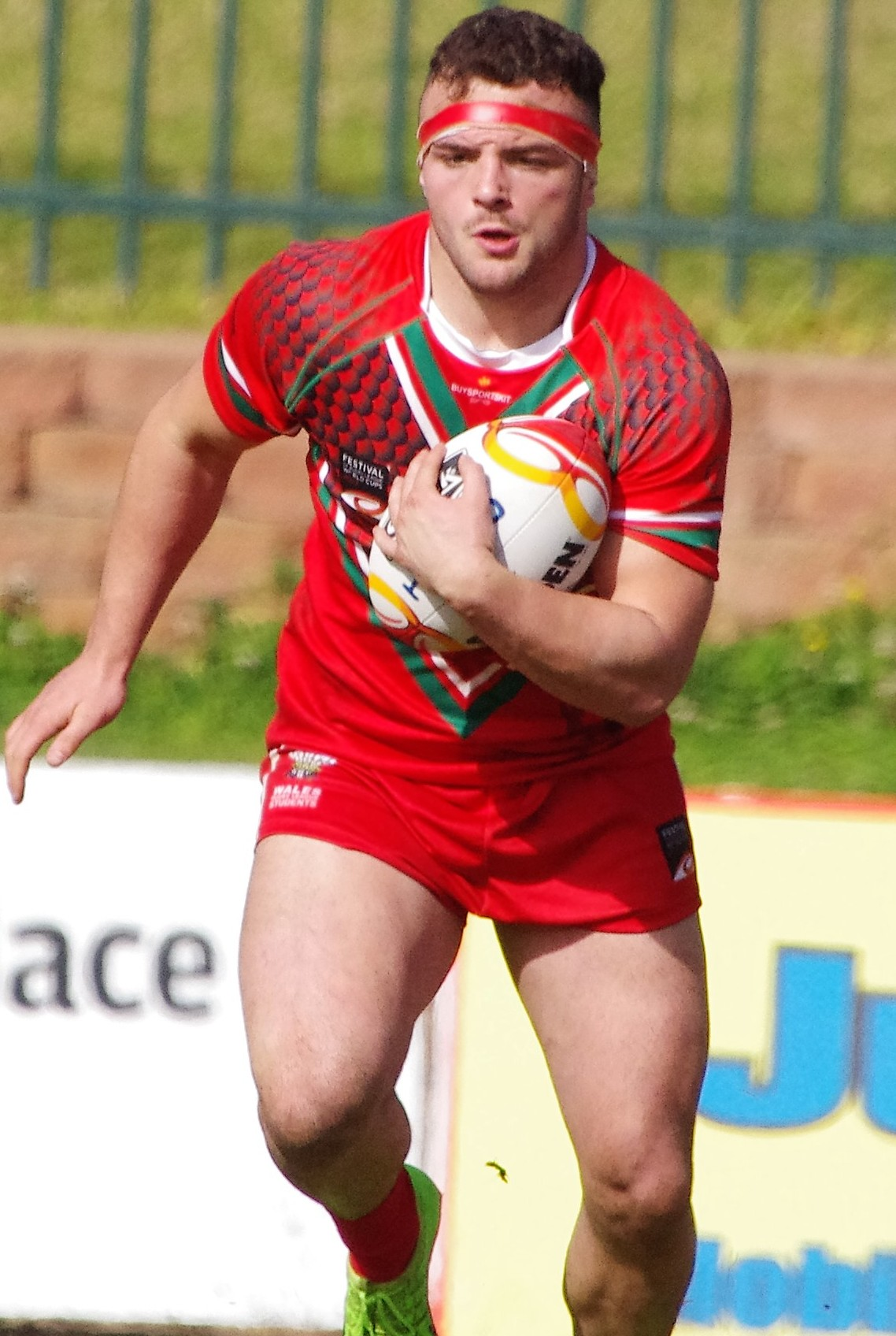

Personal information
- Full name: Connor Davies
- Born: 17 January 1997 (age 29) Swansea, Wales
- Height: 5 ft 10 in (177 cm)
- Weight: 14 st 2 lb (90 kg)

Playing information
- Position: Hooker, Loose forward
Club
Years	Team	Pld	T	G	FG	P
2015	South Wales Scorpions	13	1	0	0	4
2018–21	Halifax	23	1	0	0	4
2021–22	Villeneuve Leopards	0	0	0	0	0
2022	Workington Town	10	0	0	0	0
2022(loan)	→Dewsbury Rams	0	0	0	0	0
2023	Dewsbury Rams	25	5	0	0	20
2024–	Halifax Panthers	59	1	0	0	4
	Total	130	8	0	0	32
Representative
Years	Team	Pld	T	G	FG	P
2018–26	Wales	12	2	0	0	8
- Source: As of 26 October 2026
- Relatives: Curtis Davies (brother)

Connor Davies (born 17 January 1997) is a Welsh International rugby league footballer who plays as a hooker for the Halifax Panthers in the Betfred Championship.

== Playing career ==
=== South Wales Scorpions ===
Born in Swansea, Wales, Davies started his professional career at South Wales Scorpions in 2015.

=== Halifax RLFC ===
He moved to England to join Halifax, initially playing for the reserve team before making his first team debut in 2018. The club announced that Davies would be leaving Halifax at the end of the 2021 season.

=== Workington Town ===
After a brief spell with French club Villeneuve Leopards, Davies joined Workington Town in April 2022.

=== Dewsbury Rams ===
In July 2022, he was signed by Dewsbury Rams following his release by Workington Town.

=== Halifax Panthers (re-join) ===
On 7 Nov 2023 it was reported that he had signed for Halifax Panthers in the RFL Championship on a 1-year deal.

=== International career ===
He was selected in the Wales 9s squad for the 2019 Rugby League World Cup 9s.

Davies was named in the Wales squad for the 2021 Rugby League World Cup.

He scored his 2nd try for Wales in the 24-0 win over Ireland on 25 October 2025.

== Personal life ==
His twin brother Curtis Davies is also a professional rugby league player
