= Sion Jones (rugby league) =

Wales international rugby league footballer

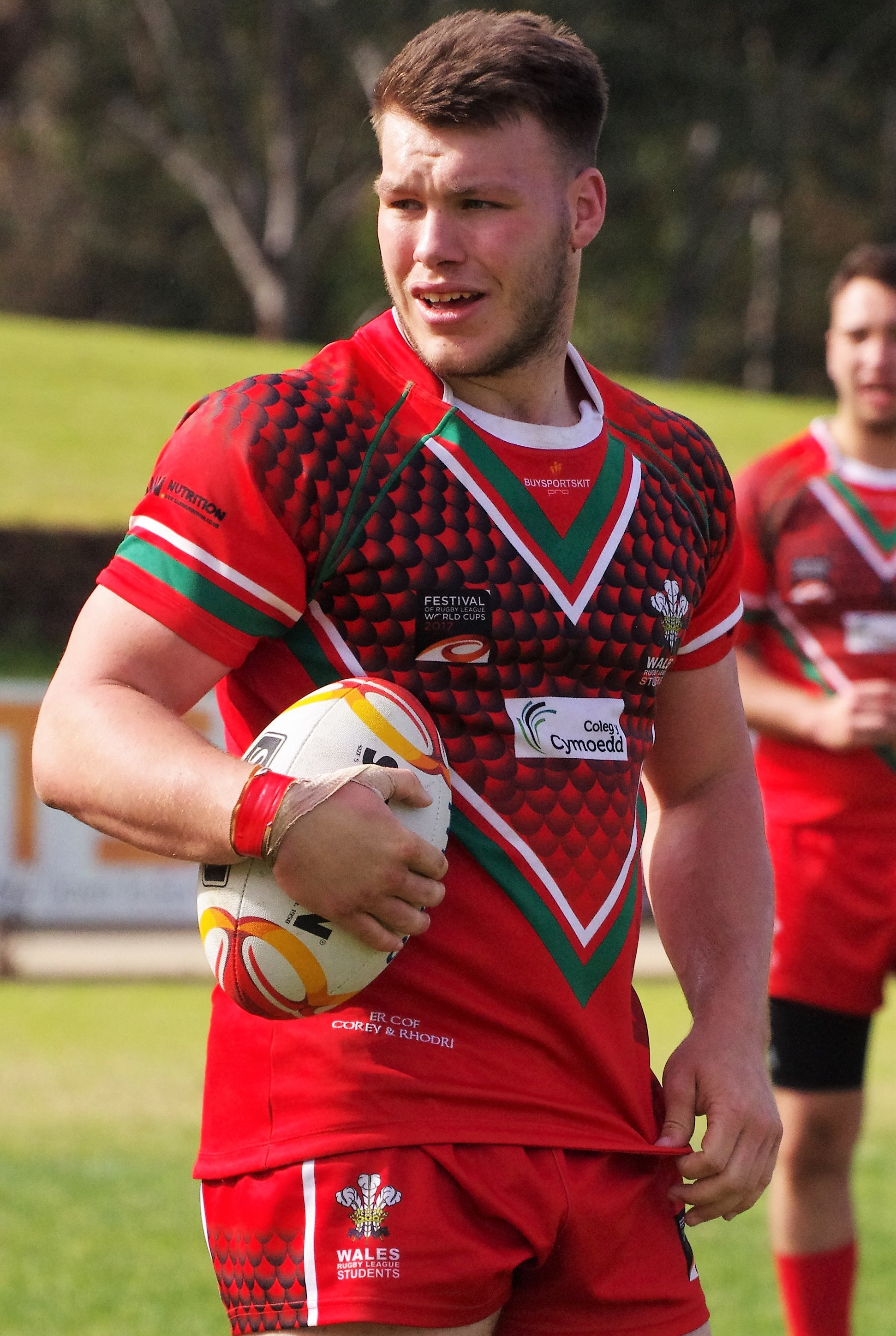

Personal information
- Full name: Siôn Jones
- Born: 16 December 1997 (age 28) Barry, Vale of Glamorgan, Wales
- Height: 6 ft 0 in (183 cm)
- Weight: 16 st 3 lb (103 kg)

Playing information

Rugby league
- Position: Prop, Second-row, Loose forward
Club
Years	Team	Pld	T	G	FG	P
2016–17	South Wales Scorpions	15	4	0	0	16
2018–22	Halifax	13	1	0	0	4
2021(loan)	→ Hunslet RLFC	6	3	0	0	12
2022–23	Hunslet RLFC	6	0	0	0	0
2023	Rochdale Hornets	8	0	0	0	0
	Total	48	8	0	0	32
Representative
Years	Team	Pld	T	G	FG	P
2018–	Wales	1	0	0	0	0

Rugby union
Club
Years	Team	Pld	T	G	FG	P
2021	Pontypridd RFC			0	0
- Source: As of 5 April 2025

Sion Jones (born 16 December 1997) is a Welsh professional rugby league footballer who played as a prop for Rochdale Hornets in the RFL League 1.

== Background ==
Jones was born in Barry, Vale of Glamorgan, Wales.
