= Mark Rowley (rugby union) =

Wales international rugby union player & rugby league administrator

- Full name: Mark Andrew Rowley
- Born: 8 November 1964 (age 62) Pontypridd, Wales
- Height: 6 ft 7 in (201 cm)
- Weight: 261 lb (118 kg)

Rugby union career
- Position: Lock
Senior career
Years	Team	Apps	(Points)
1984–98	Pontypridd	261	(?)
International career
Years	Team	Apps	(Points)
1996–97	Wales	6	(0)

Mark Andrew Rowley (born 8 November 1964) is a Welsh former rugby union international who was capped in six Tests for Wales. He is a former chairman and general manager of Wales Rugby League.

Born in Pontypridd, Rowley was a long time servant of Pontypridd RFC, who became the first player to reach 100 Heineken League games. He also had a stint with Cardiff RFC in the late 1980s.

Rowley, a lock, was 32 years of age by the time he was called up to debut for Wales. He had previously been approached by Ireland selectors, as he would qualify through his Irish grandmother, but turned them down due to the long qualification period that would be involved. His first Wales cap came against the touring Springboks in 1996 and he played in three of Wales' four matches in their 1997 Five Nations Championship campaign.

== See also ==
- List of Wales national rugby union players
