= Wales national rugby league team =

Sports team that represents Wales

Wales

Team information
- Nickname: Dragons, Red Dragons
- Governing body: Wales Rugby League
- Region: Europe
- Head coach: Paul Berry
- Captain: Matty Fozard
- Most caps: Rhys Williams (37)
- Top try-scorer: Rhys Williams (25)
- Top point-scorer: Iestyn Harris (165)
- IRL ranking: 13th

Uniforms
First colours

Team results
- First international
- Wales 9–8 New Zealand (Aberdare, Wales; 1 January 1908)
- Biggest win
- United States 4–92 Wales (Philadelphia, United States; 11 June 1995)
- Biggest defeat
- England 74–0 Wales (Doncaster, England; 10 October 2008)
- World Cup
- Appearances: 5 (first time in 1975)
- Best result: Semi-finals (1995, 2000)

The Wales national rugby league team (Welsh: tîm rygbi'r gynghrair cenedlaethol Cymru), nicknamed the Dragons (Welsh: Dreigiau) or the Red Dragons (Welsh: Dreigiau Cochion), represents Wales in representative rugby league football matches. Currently the team is ranked 12th in the IRL World Rankings. The team was run under the auspices of the Rugby Football League, but an independent body, Wales Rugby League, now runs the team from Cardiff. Six Welsh players have been entered into the Rugby Football League Hall of Fame.

As with other Welsh national sporting teams, Wales' strip has been primarily red. However, in the World Cup campaign in 2000 they wore a shirt featuring the Welsh flag, adding a touch of green and white. The team is known as "The Dragons" and so the team's logo on the shirt is a red dragon.

The team date back to 1907, making them the third oldest national side after England and New Zealand, and it was a touring New Zealand side that Wales first played against in 1908, winning 9–8 at Aberdare. Since then, Wales have regularly played England, since 1935 France, as well as welcomed the touring Australia and New Zealand teams, although they rarely toured themselves, not playing a match in the Southern Hemisphere until 1975. For 26 years Wales competed against their two biggest rivals, England and France, in the European Nations Cup, winning the trophy four times.

Wales has also competed in the World Cup on five occasions, the first time being in 1975. In 1995 and 2000 they had their most successful tournaments to date, making the Semi-Finals on both occasions before being beaten by England and Australia respectively. Wales failed to qualify for the 2008 World Cup, being the second highest ranked side not to do so, having lost to Scotland on points difference over two matches. They then qualified for the 2013 World Cup but failed to win a game, including losing 32–16 to low ranked Italy in their opening game at the Millennium Stadium in Cardiff.

In recent seasons, Wales has taken massive strides under former player Iestyn Harris who had coached Wales to back to back European Cup successes, which culminated in a Four Nations appearance in 2011. In 2014 former England and France coach John Kear became the new head coach after Iestyn Harris left the post to concentrate on his new job as head coach at Salford Red Devils.

== History ==
=== Background ===
For most of its history, Wales has been represented by the Great Britain national rugby league team in tours and world cups. The only competitive exception to this was the European Championship. Wales, in its early years, would also play regular friendlies against England to ensure the strength of the Great Britain side. Wales, unlike England, would more often play separate test matches against the Australia or New Zealand tour opponents ahead of the Great Britain games.

=== Foundations ===
On 5 April 1904, England played an international match against the "Other Nationalities", a team of Welshmen and Scotsmen, in Wigan. Of the twelve players who played for the Other Nationalities team, as it was a 12-a-side game, ten of them were Welshmen coming from Northern English clubs. At the turn of the century many Welshmen made the switch from rugby union, wanting to be paid for playing, and although the numbers switching were constantly increasing, the Northern Union did not think that a Welsh side would be strong enough for England. After 80 minutes however, the Other Nationalities had beaten England 9–3. Nevertheless, this team carried on for another two years, playing England annually in 1905 and 1906, losing 26–11 and drawing 3–3 respectively.

=== The Kiwis In Aberdare ===
From 1905 to 1910 Rugby League as a sport enjoyed growth, not just in Wales and England, but also on the east coast of Australia and in northern New Zealand. When Albert Henry Baskerville's NZ All Golds with their guest Australian star Dally Messenger arrived in Britain for the inaugural tour by a southern hemisphere side, the first full international was against Wales on New Year's Day 1908. The Welsh rugby league team were contesting their first national fixture, and managed to beat the touring Kiwis 9–8 in Aberdare in front of 20,000 spectators. This was the first international match played under new "Northern Union" rules, which would later be rapidly changed again, but these rules were a small departure from traditional rugby union rules which had been used in previous international matches (minus the number of players, who were experimentally changed by the NU several times). The New Zealand team, or the "All Golds" as they were being called by the New Zealand newspapers, had never played rugby by these rules before but did have a week of preparation and training sessions leading up to the match. With this Welsh victory and large crowd, Wales played their second fixture at the Mid Rhondda Athletic Ground in Tonypandy, and managed to win that match too recording a 35–18 win against what would soon become their main rival, the England Lions. At the end of 1908 Wales played their third and final fixture of the decade, playing England again, but this time in Broughton, Lancashire. This time they lost 31–7. However, in 1909 another victory was to occur for Welsh Rugby League, with a Welsh League XIII made up of players still playing in Wales beating a touring Australian side 14–13 in Merthyr.

=== Defeats against England ===
In the years before the outbreak of the war, Wales regularly played England. The two national teams played each other every year, including 1914. Due to Rugby League only extensively being played in the two countries in the whole of the Northern Hemisphere, touring Australia and New Zealand teams were the only chances to play someone different. Although the two matches against the English played in Wales were played in Ebbw Vale in Monmouthshire, the Welsh travelled around England for away matches, playing in Coventry, Oldham, Plymouth and St. Helens. Collectively those seven matches in Wales and England produced six defeats for the Welsh team, although there were signs of improvement, in the last match in St Helens the Dragons narrowly lost by just four points, the match ending 16–12. On the 7 October 1911 Wales played Australia for the first time. The match, held at Ebbw Vale again, drew 7,000 people to watch Wales go down 20–28. The match was significant though because throughout the next few decades Australia would play the Dragons in Wales whenever they toured Great Britain. During and after the First World War many sports suffered, and rugby league in Wales was no exception, the team didn't play a match again until 1921.

=== The Twenties ===
Jim Sullivan, born in Cardiff, first played for Wales on the 21 December 1920 against Australia and played a then record 26 times for Wales throughout the 1920s, and 1930s. This picture depicts him with the Championship Trophy for Wigan.

After a seven-year hiatus Wales once again played England and continued to do so annually throughout the 1920s, apart from in 1924. Because of the long hiatus a large proportion of players competing in the 1921 match were earning their first cap for the team. The first game at Leeds saw Wales lose 35–9 in front of 13,000. A further 13,000 saw the 1921–22 Kangaroo touring side play Wales in December 1921, this time in Pontypridd. Like the first time these nations played each other, Australia narrowly defeated the Welsh, the final score being 16–21. In 1922 Wales took part in the first international rugby league match to be played in London. England beat Wales 12–7 in Herne Hill but just 3,000 people turned up to watch, one of the lowest attendances to ever watch a Wales match. After four more matches against England in various Rugby League strongholds in Northern England, the Dragons once again played in Wales. Two matches were played in 1926 in Pontypridd, the same year that a Pontypridd domestic side joined the English leagues, although they disbanded a year later. The first match saw finished Wales 22–30 England with a record 23,000 in attendance. The second match saw Wales comfortably beat the touring New Zealand 34–8. Three more matches against England were played including one in November 1928 played in Cardiff. It was in the 1920s that Jim Sullivan, one of three Welsh players to be enrolled into the Rugby League Hall Of Fame, started rising through the ranks at Wigan. A career spanning 25 years saw him play many times for Wales picking up 26 caps, a record that was only beaten in 2010 by Ian Watson. He also represented Great Britain 25 times and Glamorgan and Monmouthshire 12 times.

=== The European Nations Cup ===
The 1930s were to herald a new era for the team as it emerged at times as one of the dominant sides in world rugby league. In 1930 and 1933 Wales played Australia at Wembley Stadium in London. On both occasions they failed to win, losing 26–10 and being thrashed 51–19. However at the time Australia were arguably considered the world's second best nation (behind England) and so particularly in the first game, Wales had done very well against the touring Kangaroos. Wales luck against England did not change either suffering three losses to the Lions in three games, in Huddersfield, Salford and Leeds. They were very unlucky in the latter however, with England winning 14 points to 13. Exactly 27 years after Wales played their first match, they played France for the first time in a new competition called the European Nations Cup, in which Wales, France and England would play two matches each. Wales and France kicked off the tournament on New Year's Day in front of 15,000 in Bordeaux. But the Dragons lost 18–11, and their match against England was just as bad losing 24–11 in Liverpool. The France versus England match finished a 15–15 draw so England won the inaugural competition on points difference. Wales finished bottom. The next European Nations Cup brought better fortunes to the Welsh and they kicked off the competition, which was staged across Winter 1935 and 1936, with a 41–7 thrashing against France. The team were cheered on by 25,000 people at Llanelli and three months later Wales did the unexpected and squeezed past England, winning 14–17 away at Hull. This was a huge result for Wales, having not beaten England since 1923, and they had won the cup for the first time. For the next two competitions Wales successfully defended the cup. A 3–2 win against the English in Pontypridd, coupled with a 9–3 victory in Paris saw Wales clinch the cup for the second time, and then in 1938 the Dragons beat England again by one point in Bradford before beating the French 18–2. This represents perhaps the highest point in Welsh rugby league history with great players such as Jim Sullivan, Gus Risman, Alan Edwards and Alec Givvons featuring. In 1935 Welsh rugby league would produce its first black international in George Bennett (some 48 years before Welsh rugby union would do so). In the 1938/1939 tournament, the last to be held for six years because of the Second World War, Wales beat their main rivals England before dramatically losing 16–10 in Bordeaux against Les Tricolores. Because of the French's victory against England, Wales finished second and the cup was taken across the channel.

During the 1978 Kangaroo tour Wales played Australia at St Helen's ground in Swansea, losing 8–3.

=== Timeline ===
Wales team shirt used in the 2000 World Cup.

- 1 January 1908 – Wales play their first international match against New Zealand played at the Athletic Ground in Aberdare in front of 15,000 fans. Wales won 9–8.
- 19 January 1909 – The Welsh League XIII defeat the touring Australians 14–13 at Penydarren Park in Merthyr Tydfil.
- 1926 – Wales defeat the touring New Zealand 34–8 at Pontypridd. The Kiwis were awarded full caps for the match.
- 18 January 1930 – Australia defeat Wales 26–10 in the first ever rugby league international played at London's Wembley Stadium. The non-test international attracted 20,000 fans.
- 1936 – Wales win the 1935–36 European Rugby League Championship with a 17–14 win over England at Craven Park in Hull.
- 1937 – Wales win their second consecutive European Championship.
- 1938 – Wales win the European championship for the third consecutive season.
- 24 November 1945 – 30,000 people attend a match against England at the St. Helen's Rugby Ground in Swansea. As of 2017 this remains the largest stand alone attendance for an international match in Wales.
- 1947 Wales defeat England 10–8 at Central Park in Wigan.
- 10 June 1975 – Clive Sullivan's try effectively won the World title for Australia, as Wales beat England 12–7 at Lang Park in Brisbane, thanks to Sullivan's match-clinching try after chasing a ball over the English line. The final three games in the tournament, however, all ended in losses and Wales finish third. 1975 was the first time Wales appeared at the Rugby League World Cup, all previous cups had seen the British isles represented by Great Britain.
- 27 October 1991 – Papua New Guinea met Wales at Vetch Field, Swansea. Roared on by a fervent crowd of 11,422; Wales won by a record 68–0 margin, scoring thirteen tries. In that match dual-rugby international Jonathan Davies scored 24 points from two tries and 8 goals.

Wales played Papua New Guinea on the Kumuls tour of Europe. The match finished 50–10 in favour of Wales.

- December 1992 – Wales defeat France in Perpignan, their first win on French soil for 30 years.
- 1995 – Wales win the European Championship, with a win over England (the first since 1968 and the biggest on Welsh soil). Mike Gregory is head coach for the 1995 World Cup. Wales make the semi-finals of the World Cup, only to lose to England 25–10 at Old Trafford in Manchester. The 1995 World Cup between Wales and Western Samoa in front of a capacity crowd of over 15,000 at Swansea was a pinnacle for Welsh Rugby League in the modern era. Following rugby union's decision to go professional, the flow of talent going north from the valleys dried up and Jonathan Davies returned to rugby union.
- 5 June 1996 – Wales beat France in Carcassonne to bring home the European Championship for the first time in 57 years.
- 1997 – Anger as the Rugby Football League announce that at the proposed 1998 World Cup (never played), Wales would not be included to allow the appearance of the New Zealand Māoris. Wales were once again to form part of Great Britain.
- 19 June 1998 – Emerging England defeat a full Welsh side in Widnes.
- 2000 – Wales again made the World Cup semi finals, losing to Australia 46–22 in a hard-fought battle at Huddersfield.
- November 2005 – Wales took second in the European Nations Cup, losing to France in the final at Carcassonne.
- 9 November 2007 – Wales loses 50–26 to Lebanon, having led 16–10 at half-time, ending their chances to qualify for the 2008 Rugby League World Cup
- 2009 – Wales win the European cup; defeating Scotland 28–16 in the final at the Brewery Field in Bridgend. Only 1,608 spectators turn up for the game.
- 2010 – Wales win the European cup to qualify for the 2011 Four Nations against Australia, England and New Zealand.
- 27 October 2012 – Wales are thrashed 80–12 by England at the Racecourse Ground, Wrexham as part of the Autumn Internationals series.
- 2013 – Wales failed to win a game at the 2013 Rugby League World Cup held in England and Wales.
- October and November 2014 – Wales were beaten in all three games in the 2014 European Cup.
- 16 October 2015 – Wales ended their spree of 12 consecutive defeats with an 18–12 victory against Scotland in the opening game of the 2015 European Cup. Their last victory before this result occurred on 22 October 2011 with a 30–6 win over Ireland. Wales would go on to win their remaining two matches of the campaign, becoming the only unbeaten team in the competition, and therefore become the champions of the 2015 European Cup competition, their 7th European Championship win in 32 championships held since 1935.
- 4 April 2017 – The team received funding from Sport Wales for the first time, in preparation for the 2017 Rugby League World Cup.

== Identity ==
=== Kit ===
Primary	1978–1985	1994–1999	2000–2004	2017 World Cup	2021 World Cup	2024–2025

=== Stadium ===
In July 2024, The Gnoll in Neath became the home stadium of the team as well as all other Welsh national rugby league teams.

== Coaches ==
Name	Years	G	W	D	L	%	Honours
(Wales) Les Pearce	1975	9	3	0	6	33.33	1975 Rugby League World Cup – Group stage
(Wales) David Watkins	1977	2	1	0	1	50.00	
(Wales) John Mantle (Wales) Bill Francis	1978	1	0	0	1	0.00	
(Wales) Kel Coslett	1978–1981	5	0	0	5	0.00	
(Wales) David Watkins	1982–1984	2	0	0	2	0.00	
(Wales) Clive Griffiths	1991–2000	25	15	0	10	60.00	1995 European Rugby League Championship; 1995 Rugby League World Cup – Third place 2000 Rugby League World Cup – Third place
(England) Neil Kelly	2001–2003	5	1	0	4	20.00	
(England) Stuart Wilkinson	2004	2	0	0	2	0.00	
(Wales) Martin Hall	2005–2007	7	4	0	3	57.14	
(Australia) John Dixon	2008	1	0	0	1	0.00	
(Wales) Iestyn Harris	2009–2013	18	7	0	11	38.89	2009 European Cup; 2010 European Cup; 2013 Rugby League World Cup – Group stage
(England) John Kear	2014–2025	10	4	0	6	40.00	2015 European Cup; 2017 Rugby League World Cup – Group stage
(England) Paul Berry	2025–	4	3	0	1	75.00	

== Players ==
=== Current squad ===
Squad selected for the October 2026 Celtic Cup against Ireland, Scotland and a test match against United States:

Player	Caps	Club
Toko Owen	0	(Australia) Brisbane Broncos
Jackson Connor	0	(Australia) Carina Tigers
Sam Grice	1	(England) Castleford Tigers
Connor Davies	12	(England) Halifax Panthers
Curtis Davies	8	(England) Halifax Panthers
Charlie Newton	2	(England) Huddersfield Giants
Josh Harding	0	(England) Hull FC
Will Mathers	0	(England) Hull FC
Evan Williams	0	(England) Hull Kingston Rovers
Ant Walker	15	(England) Hunslet
Max Clarke	2	(England) Keighley Cougars
Finn Walker	0	(England) Leigh Leopards
Henry Parker	0	(England) Leigh Leopards
Jake Nottingham	0	(Australia) Lithgow Workies Wolves
Ioan Herbert	0	(England) London Broncos
Jacob Purcell	0	(England) London Broncos
Jermarie Chatham	0	(England) London Broncos
Matt Ross	4	(England) London Broncos
Will Jones	0	(England) London Broncos
Owen Restall	0	(England) Midlands Hurricanes
Taine Woodford	0	(Australia) Newcastle Knights
George Birch	1	(England) Newcastle Thunder
Ashton Robinson	5	North Wales Crusaders
Huw Worthington	5	North Wales Crusaders
Isaac Wheatley	0	North Wales Crusaders
Charlie Glover	2	(England) Salford
Fin Yates	3	(England) Salford
Oliver Garmston	0	(England) Salford
Sam Bowring	5	(England) Salford
Billy Walkley	5	(England) Sheffield Eagles
Alex Green	0	(Wales) Bridgend Blue Bulls
Llewellyn Hawkes	0	(Wales) Bridgend Blue Bulls
Lewis Ingram	0	(Wales) Bridgend Blue Bulls
Kavan Phillips	0	South Wales Jets
Mason Phillips	0	South Wales Jets
Ed Williams	0	(England) Warrington Wolves
Matty Fozard	18	(England) Widnes Vikings
Mike Butt	8	(England) Widnes Vikings
Sam Dickenson	2	(England) Wigan Warriors

=== Notable former players ===
==== Rugby Football League Hall Of Fame ====
The following Welsh players have been inducted into the British Rugby Football League Hall of Fame (instituted 1988):

- Billy Boston (1988)
- Gus Risman (1988)
- Jim Sullivan (1988)
- Lewis Jones (2013)
- Clive Sullivan (2022)
- David Watkins (2022)

==== Welsh Sports Hall Of Fame ====
The following Welsh players have been inducted into the Welsh Sports Hall of Fame:

- 1990 Billy Boston
- 1992 Jim Sullivan
- 1998 Lewis Jones
- 2000 Gus Risman, David Watkins
- 2003 Jonathan Davies, Willie Davies
- 2004 Trevor Foster
- 2009 Clive Sullivan

== Records ==
- As of 17 February 2020
- **Bold**- denotes player still active at club level

=== Most capped players ===
Rank	Name	Career	Caps	Tries	Position
1	Rhys Williams	2008-2025	37	25	WG
2	**Elliot Kear**	2009-2025	32	12	FB
3	Ian Watson	1995-2011	30	7	HK
4	Jordan James	2003-2013	30	9	PR
5	Jim Sullivan	1921-1939	26	3	FB
6	Lee Briers	1998-2011	23	9	SH
6	Christiaan Roets	2006-2016	23	13	CE

=== Top try scorers ===
Rank	Name	Career	Tries	Caps	Position
1	Rhys Williams	2008-2025	25	37	WG
2	Christiaan Roets	2006-2016	13	23	CE
3	Iestyn Harris	1995-2007	12	18	SO
3	**Elliot Kear**	2009-2025	12	26	FB
5	Lee Briers	1998-2011	9	23	SH
5	Jordan James	2003-2013	9	30	PR
5	Adam Hughes	2002-2007	9	13	CE

=== Top points scorers ===
Rank	Name	Career	Points	Caps	Position
1	Iestyn Harris	1995-2007	165	18	SO
2	Jim Sullivan	1921-1939	129	26	FB
3	Lee Briers	1998-2011	100	23	SH
4	Jonathan Davies	1993-1995	87	9	FB
5	David Watkins	1968-1979	74	16	FB
6	Rhys Williams	2008-2025	72	26	WG
7	Lloyd White	2009-2018	26	62	HK

== Competitive record ==
=== Overall ===
Below is table of the representative rugby matches played by the Wales national XIII at test level up until 22 October 2024.

Opponent	Matches	Won	Drawn	Lost	Win %	For	Aga	Diff
Australia	13	0	0	13	0%	143	455	–312
Cook Islands	3	1	0	2	33.33%	74	52	+22
England	68	16	2	50	23.53%	801	1,510	–709
England Knights	2	1	0	1	50%	19	34	–15
Fiji	1	0	0	1	0%	6	72	–66
France	44	18	0	26	40.91%	653	747	–94
Ireland	10	6	0	4	60%	253	199	+54
Italy	3	1	0	2	33.33%	42	59	–17
Jamaica	2	1	1	0	50%	38	32	+6
Lebanon	3	1	0	2	33.33%	72	110	–38
New Zealand	10	3	0	7	30%	158	264	–106
(Māori people) New Zealand Maori	1	1	0	0	100%	18	12	+6
Other Nationalities	5	1	0	4	20%	60	101	–41
Papua New Guinea	5	3	0	2	60%	146	104	+42
Russia	1	1	0	0	100%	74	4	+70
Samoa	1	1	0	0	100%	22	10	+12
Scotland	10	6	0	4	60%	266	221	+45
Serbia	3	3	0	0	100%	176	8	+168
South Africa	1	1	0	0	100%	40	12	+28
Tonga	1	0	0	1	0%	6	32	-26
United States	3	2	0	1	66.67%	174	38	+136
Total	190	67	3	120	35.26%	3,241	4,076	–835

=== World Cup ===
World Cup Record
Year	Round	Position	P	W	D	L	F	A	PD
(France) 1954	Competed as (United Kingdom) Great Britain								
(Australia) 1957	Competed as (United Kingdom) Great Britain								
(England) 1960	Competed as (United Kingdom) Great Britain								
(Australia) (New Zealand) 1968	Competed as (United Kingdom) Great Britain								
(England) 1970	Competed as (United Kingdom) Great Britain								
(France) 1972	Competed as (United Kingdom) Great Britain								
1975	Group stage	3rd of 5	8	3	0	5	110	130	-20
(Australia) (New Zealand) 1977	Competed as (United Kingdom) Great Britain								
1985–88	Competed as (United Kingdom) Great Britain								
1989–92	Competed as (United Kingdom) Great Britain								
(England) 1995	Semi-finals	3rd of 10	3	2	0	1	60	41	+19
(England) (Ireland) (France) (Scotland) (Wales) 2000	Semi-finals	3rd of 16	5	3	0	1	124	140	-16
(Australia) 2008	did not qualify								
(England) (Wales) 2013	Group stage	12th of 14	3	0	0	3	56	84	-28
(Australia) (New Zealand) (Papua New Guinea) 2017	Group stage	13th of 14	3	0	0	3	18	156	-138
(England) 2021	Group stage	13th of 16	3	0	0	3	18	86	-68
(Australia) 2026	did not qualify								
Total		6/17 (Note: 6/17 tournaments as Wales, 16/17 tournaments as Wales or Great Britain)	25	8	0	16	386	637	-251

=== Four Nations ===
Four Nations Record
Year	Round	Position	Pld	W	D	L	F	A	PD
(England) (France) 2009	did not enter								
(Australia) (New Zealand) 2010	did not enter								
(England) (Wales) 2011	Group stage	4th of 4th	3	0	0	3	18	134	–116
(Australia) (New Zealand) 2014	did not enter								
(England) 2016	did not enter								

=== European Championship ===
European Championship Record
Year	Round	Position		Pld			
1935	Single Group Round Robin	3rd out of 3		2			
1935–36	Single Group Round Robin	1st out of 3		2			
1936–37	Single Group Round Robin	1st out of 3		2			
1938	Single Group Round Robin	1st out of 3		2			
1938–39	Single Group Round Robin	2nd out of 3		2			
1945–46	Single Group Round Robin	3rd out of 3		2			
1946–47	Single Group Round Robin	2nd out of 3		2			
1947–48	Single Group Round Robin	3rd out of 3		2			
1948–49	Single Group Round Robin	3rd out of 3		2			
1949–50	Single Group Round Robin	3rd out of 4		3			
1950–51	Single Group Round Robin	4th out of 4		3			
1951–52	Single Group Round Robin	4th out of 4		3			
1952–53	Single Group Round Robin	2nd out of 4		3			
1953–54	Single Group Round Robin	4th out of 4		3			
1955–56	Single Group Round Robin	Did not participate					
1969–70	Single Group Round Robin	3rd out of 3		2			
1975	Single Group Round Robin	2nd out of 3		2			
1977	Single Group Round Robin	2nd out of 3		2			
1978	Single Group Round Robin	2nd out of 3		2			
1979	Single Group Round Robin	3rd out of 3		2			
1980	Single Group Round Robin	3rd out of 3		2			
1981	Single Group Round Robin	3rd out of 3		2			
1995	Single Group Round Robin	1st out of 3		2			
1996	Single Group Round Robin	2nd out of 3		2			
2003	Group Stage	3rd/4th out of 6		3			
2004	Group Stage	5th/6th out of 6		3			
2005	Final	2nd out of 6		4			
2009	Final	1st out of 6		4			
2010	Single Group Round Robin	1st out of 4		3			
2012	Single Group Round Robin	Did not participate					
2014	Single Group Round Robin	4th out of 4		3			
2015	Single Group Round Robin	1st out of 4		3			
2018	Single Group Round Robin	2nd out of 6		3			
Promotion and relegation era
Year	League	Round	Position	Pld	W	D	L
2023	A	TBA out of 8		Qualified			

== Attendance records ==
=== Highest all-time attendances ===
Attendance	Opposing team	Venue	Tournament
45,052	Italy	Millennium Stadium, Cardiff	2013 Rugby League World Cup
42,344	New Zealand	Wembley Stadium, London	2011 Rugby League Four Nations
30,042	England	Old Trafford, Manchester	1995 Rugby League World Cup Semi-final
30,000	England	St Helens Rugby Ground, Swansea	1945–46 European Rugby League Championship
30,000	France	Stade Vélodrome, Marseille	1948–49 European Rugby League Championship

=== Highest attendances per opponent ===
Attendance	Opposing team	Venue	Tournament
45,052	Italy	Millennium Stadium, Cardiff	2013 Rugby League World Cup
42,344	New Zealand	Wembley Stadium, London	2011 Rugby League Four Nations
30,042	England	Old Trafford, Manchester	1995 Rugby League World Cup Semi-final
30,000	France	Stade Vélodrome, Marseille	1948–49 European Rugby League Championship
25,386	Australia	Sydney Cricket Ground, Sydney	1975 Rugby League World Cup
15,385	Samoa	Vetch Field, Swansea	1995 Rugby League World Cup
14,800	Papua New Guinea	PNG Football Stadium, Port Moresby	2017 Rugby League World Cup
14,744	Ireland	Perth Rectangular Stadium, Perth	2017 Rugby League World Cup
8,019	United States	Racecourse Ground, Wrexham	2013 Rugby League World Cup
7,752	Tonga	Langtree Park, St Helens	2021 Rugby League World Cup
7,732	Fiji	Willows Sports Complex, Townsville	2017 Rugby League World Cup
6,188	Cook Islands	Leigh Sports Village, Leigh	2021 Rugby League World Cup
2,378	Scotland	Brewery Field, Bridgend	2008 Rugby League World Cup Qualifying
1,497	Lebanon	Stradey Park, Llanelli	2000 Rugby League World Cup
1,378	Jamaica	Belle Vue, Wakefield	2017 Wales vs Jamaica
1,082	Russia	Talbot Athletic Ground, Port Talbot	2003 European Nations Cup

=== Highest attendances per opponent in Wales ===
Attendance	Opposing team	Venue	Tournament
45,052	Italy	Millennium Stadium, Cardiff	2013 Rugby League World Cup
30,000	England	St Helens Rugby Ground, Swansea	1945–46 European Rugby League Championship
23,000	France	St Helens Rugby Ground, Swansea	1975 European Rugby League Championship
18,283	New Zealand	St Helens Rugby Ground, Swansea	1947–48 New Zealand Kiwis tour
15,385	Samoa	Vetch Field, Swansea	1995 Rugby League World Cup
13,000	Australia	Taff Vale Park, Pontypridd	1921–22 Kangaroo tour
11,422	Papua New Guinea	Vetch Field, Swansea	1991 Papua New Guinea Kumuls tour
8,019	United States	Racecourse Ground, Wrexham	2013 Rugby League World Cup
5,016	Cook Islands	Racecourse Ground, Wrexham	2000 Rugby League World Cup
2,378	Scotland	Brewery Field, Bridgend	2008 Rugby League World Cup Qualifying
2,265	Ireland	The Gnoll, Neath	2011 Wales vs Ireland
1,299	Jamaica	The Gnoll, Neath	2024 Wales vs Jamaica
1,082	Russia	Talbot Athletic Ground, Port Talbot	2003 European Nations Cup

== Honours ==
Major:
World Cup:
Semi-finalists (2): 1995, 2000

Regional:
European Championship:
Winners (7):1936, 1937, 1938, 1995, 2009, 2010, 2015
Runners-up (9): 1938–39, 1946–47, 1952–53, 1975, 1977, 1978, 1996, 2005, 2018

== IRL Rankings ==
IRL Men's World Rankings
Official rankings as of August 2026
Rank	Change	Team	Pts %
1	Steady	Australia	100
2	Steady	New Zealand	82
3	Steady	England	70
4	Steady	Samoa	56
5	Steady	Tonga	54
6	Steady	Papua New Guinea	47
7	Steady	Fiji	34
8	▲1	Cook Islands	24
9	▲2	Netherlands	23
10	▲2	Ukraine	21
11	▼3	France	21
12	▼2	Serbia	20
13	Steady	Wales	18
14	Steady	Ireland	17
15	Steady	Greece	14
16	Steady	Malta	14
17	▲12	Canada	13
18	▼1	Italy	11
19	▼1	Jamaica	9
20	▲7	Scotland	8
21	▲1	United States	8
22	▼3	Poland	7
23	▼3	Lebanon	7
24	▼1	Germany	7
25	▼1	Czech Republic	6
26	▼5	Norway	6
27	▼2	Chile	5
28	▲2	Philippines	5
29	▼1	South Africa	4
30	Steady	Brazil	3
31	Steady	Morocco	3
32	▲1	Argentina	3
33	▲2	Ghana	2
34	▲2	Kenya	2
35	▼1	Montenegro	2
36	▲1	Nigeria	2
37	▼5	North Macedonia	1
38	Steady	Albania	1
39	Steady	Turkey	1
40	Steady	Bulgaria	1
41	Steady	Cameroon	0
42	Steady	Japan	0
43	Steady	Spain	0
44	Steady	Colombia	0
45	Steady	Russia	0
46	Steady	El Salvador	0
47	Steady	Bosnia and Herzegovina	0
48	Steady	Hong Kong	0
49	Steady	Solomon Islands	0
50	Steady	Vanuatu	0
51	Steady	Hungary	0
52	Steady	Latvia	0
53	Steady	Denmark	0
54	Steady	Belgium	0
55	Steady	Estonia	0
56	Steady	Sweden	0
57	Steady	Niue	0
Complete rankings at www.internationalrugbyleague.com

== See also ==
- List of Wales national rugby league team players
- Rugby league in Wales
- Wales national rugby league team match results
- Wales Amateur national rugby league team
