= Neath Port Talbot Steelers =

Defunct Welsh rugby league club, based in Port Talbot, South Wales

Club information
- Founded: 2007; 19 years ago
- Exited: 2010; 16 years ago
- Website: www.nptsteelers.com

Former details
- Competition: Rugby League Conference Welsh Premier

Neath Port Talbot Steelers were a rugby league team based in Port Talbot, West Glamorgan. They played in the Welsh Premier division of the Rugby League Conference at Aberavon Green Stars RFC.

== History ==
The club was founded in 2007. The Steelers only recorded two wins during the league fixtures, however, this was enough to qualify the first round of the play-offs. They defeated Torfaen Tigers to progress to the semi-final in which they lost to the Titans in Newport.

The 2008 campaign was unsuccessful with only one win was recorded during the season.

The 2009 season saw them only one game in the whole campaign. The junior sides had very good seasons with the U15's winning the league, and the U17's coming runners-up.

The 2010 season was slow starting due to the league kicking off late as several West Wales clubs failed to complete any fixtures. The Steelers narrowly lost the first two fixture against Merthyr Wildcats and Dyffryn Devils, then with a late recruitment push dominated the remaining fixtures with good wins over Torfaen Tigers and revenge over Dyffryn Devils, the Wildcats could not play the repeat fixture due to union players having commitments. In the Welsh Conference Championship final, the Steelers won 42-10 against Torfaen Tigers at the Gnoll.

== Club honours ==
- RLC Welsh regional: 2010

== Juniors ==
Neath Port Talbot Steelers' junior teams take part in the Welsh Conference Junior League.
