= South Wales Men's League =

Rugby league for amateur clubs

- Founded: 2003
- Country: Wales
- Number of clubs: 8
- Level on pyramid: 6
- Domestic cup: Challenge Cup
- Current champions: Aberavon Fighting Irish
- Most championships: Bridgend Blue Bulls (10)
- Website: www.wrl.wales
- Current: 2024

The South Wales Men's League is a summer rugby league competition for amateur teams in South Wales. The competition was formed in 2003 as the RLC Welsh Premier. Following the 2012 restructure of amateur rugby league in Great Britain, it was renamed the South Wales Premiership.

== History ==
The Rugby League Conference (RLC) was founded in 1997 as the Southern Conference, a 10-team pilot league for teams in the South of England and English Midlands.

The RLC first expanded into Wales in 2001 when Cardiff Demons joined the South West division.

In 2003, the RLC expanded with the creation of the Welsh Premier division. This division had 6 teams in the inaugural season and was the first all-Welsh rugby league division.

The Welsh Premier division was split into two divisions, East Wales and West Wales, in 2006, though this split was reversed for the following season.

The Welsh Conference Junior League began in 2009.

In 2010, due to the growth of the sport, a Championship division was formed which would function at one tier lower than the present Premier division. This Championship division featured teams from South Wales.

The RLC Welsh Championship division was restructured after four West Wales clubs failed to fulfil their fixtures. Amman Valley Rhinos, Dinefwr Sharks, Swansea/Llanelli Dragons and West Wales Wild Boars were omitted and replaced with newly formed Dyffryn Devils.

In 2012 the league became the South Wales Premiership, with the lower Championship division being abolished. 2012 also saw the creation of the North Wales Conference. This was part of large restructure of the RLC as the Conference League South (CLS) was created.

In 2017, the competition was renamed as the South Wales Premier League, and saw three Conference League South teams return to the competition with the CLS not running that year.

From 2023, the winners of the competition will play the winners of the North Wales Conference for a place in the Challenge Cup. Due to logistical issues 2023 Champions (in their debut season), South Wales Jets were allocated the Welsh League place in the Challenge Cup.

For the 2024 season, JES Group was announced as the competition's principal sponsor.

== Position in Pyramid ==
- 1: Super League
- 2: Championship
- 3–5: National Community Rugby League
- 6: South Wales Men's League

== Teams ==
Eight teams will contest the 2024 season:

- Aberavon Fighting Irish
- Bridgend Blue Bulls
- Cynon Valley Cavaliers
- Rhondda Outlaws
- South Wales Jets
- South Wales Saints
- Swansea Rams
- Torfaen Tigers

== Format ==
The competition is played as a single round robin with one loop fixture, the top four teams qualify for the playoffs.

== Winners ==
RLC Welsh Premier era

- 2003: Bridgend Blue Bulls
- 2004: Bridgend Blue Bulls
- 2005: Bridgend Blue Bulls
- 2006: Bridgend Blue Bulls
- 2007: Bridgend Blue Bulls
- 2008: Valley Cougars
- 2009: Blackwood Bulldogs
- 2010: Valley Cougars
- 2011: Bridgend Blue Bulls

South Wales Premiership era

- 2012: Bonymaen Broncos
- 2013: Torfaen Tigers
- 2014: Bridgend Blue Bulls
- 2015: Bridgend Blue Bulls
- 2016: Bridgend Blue Bulls
- 2017: Valley Cougars
- 2018: Valley Cougars
- 2019: Rhondda Outlaws
- 2020: Cancelled due to the COVID-19 pandemic
- 2021: Bridgend Blue Bulls
- 2022: Rhondda Outlaws
- 2023: South Wales Jets
- 2024: Aberavon Fighting Irish

=== Shield/Plate winners ===
The South Wales Premiership has, on occasion, held a shield/plate competition for clubs who failed to reach the playoffs:

- 2004: Cardiff Demons
- 2005: Newport Titans
- 2009: Newport Titans
- 2010: NPT Steelers
- 2011: Bonymaen Broncos
- 2014: Valley Cougars

=== Second Tier ===
During the RLC era, a second tier competition was held for a brief period called the "RLC Wales Regional". Winner were:

- 2010: Neath Port Talbot Steelers
- 2011: Bonymaen Broncos

== Junior league ==
The South Wales Premiership also operates at under-17, under-15, and under-13 age groups.

== See also ==
- Rugby League in Wales
- Wales Rugby League
