= Rugby league in Wales =

- Country: Wales
- Governing body: Wales Rugby League; Rugby Football League (Note: Prior to the formation of Wales Rugby League (WRL) in 1995, rugby league in Wales was governed by the Rugby Football League (RFL) who have been the governing body for rugby league in all Great Britain since 1895. At present, the RFL is the official governing body for England only but shares control of certain aspects of the sport due to the continued use of the British rugby league system for domestic competition, in addition to acting as an advisor for other areas of rugby league in Wales.)
- National team: Wales
- First played: 1907

National competitions
- Rugby League World Cup

Club competitions
- RFL League 1 Conference League South; North Wales Conference; South Wales Premiership

Rugby league is a sport played in Wales. The governing body of the game in Wales is the Wales Rugby League.

There is a long but sporadic history of rugby league in Wales (Welsh: rygbi'r gynghrair). Over the decades hundreds of Welsh players have played for the leading English clubs. Consequently, the national side, nicknamed the Dragons, have often been a very strong force in the international game.

== History ==
=== Background ===
Rugby football was an increasingly popular sport for Wales in the 1890s, and particularly in the south where its popularity surpassed that of association football. The Welsh coal miners shared the same working class ethos of the miners from the northern counties of England. The impending schism of 1895 tore apart the English rugby union and in the early 1900s, the shock waves were being felt in rugby worldwide, though there was little desire in Wales to embrace professionalism. Amateurism in Wales was seen as a means of holding together a community in which there were expectations by the public on their sportsman to not turn their back on international rugby. The Welsh took pride in the position rugby gave them in the sporting world, and therefore the Welsh Rugby Union saw little attraction in turning professional.

Nonetheless, many Welsh players signed for English clubs. The Northern Union's administrators began to ponder the possibilities of international competitions against an English representative side. The first attempt met with a lack of public interest, and the first scheduled Northern Union international, also became the first postponed Northern Union international, rescheduled for the 5 April 1904 at Central Park, Wigan. Consisted of Welsh and Scottish players, the team opposing England was labelled Other Nationalities and proved too strong, winning 9–3. The fixture took place again in 1905, England winning 26–11 on 2 January at Park Avenue, Bradford, before a 3–3 draw when the fixture returned to Wigan on 1 January 1906.

In 1907, New Zealand toured England and Wales in what became the first set of international games played under Northern Union rules, and featured the first appearance of what became the Wales national rugby league team, a 9–8 victory over New Zealand.

=== First Welsh Clubs ===
In 1907, Ebbw Vale RLFC and Merthyr Tydfil RLFC joined the Northern Union, competing in the Challenge Cup and playing against the touring New Zealand team.

In the 1908-09 season, a six-team Welsh League ran alongside the Northern Union's Yorkshire and Lancashire Leagues. The touring Australian Kangaroos lost 14–13 to a league representative team at Merthyr Tydfil on 16 January 1909, and defeated Aberdare RLFC, Merthyr Tydfil, Mid-Rhondda RLFC, and Treherbert RLFC in touring fixtures. Ebbw Vale were the sole Welsh club for 1911–12, resigning at the end of that season.

=== Inter-War and Post-War ===
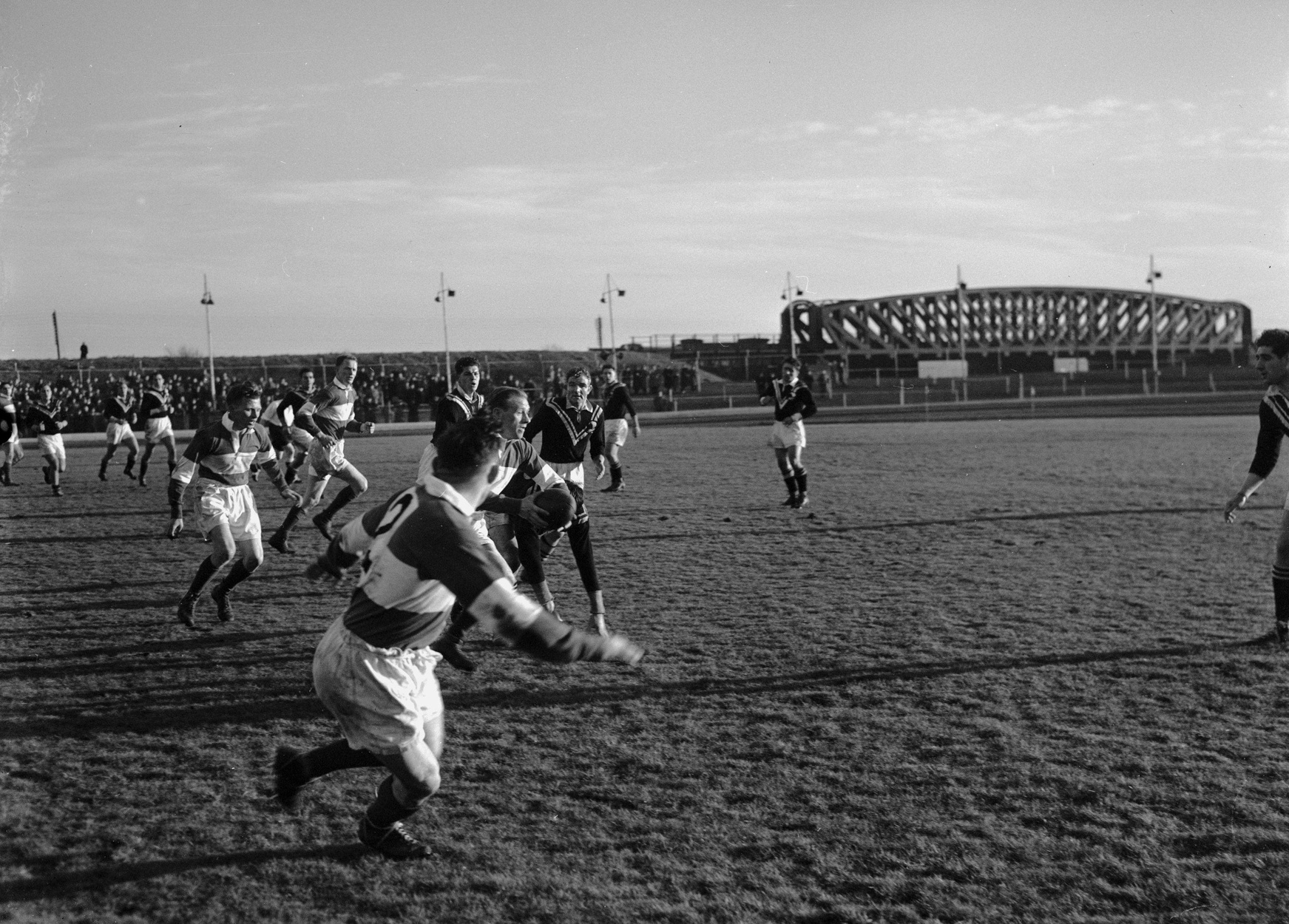
The Cardiff Rugby League Club playing a match against New Zealand

From 1949 to 1955 a Welsh league was run by the Welsh commission but it was disbanded due to lack of interest and finance. Founder members were Neath, Cardiff, Llanelli, Bridgend, Ystradgynlais, Aberavon, Amman Vale and Blaina.

Harsh economic times in the 1980s meant that rugby union players such as Jonathan Davies and Scott Gibbs "went north" to play professional rugby league in order to earn a living. This flow of players was halted when rugby union became professional in 1995.

=== 21st Century ===
In the early 21st century rugby league gained in popularity in Wales, with matches between teams in the Welsh Premier division generally drawing crowds of around 300 spectators.

With the growth of the Rugby League Conference throughout England, the RFL and its WRL arm set up an amateur club, the Cardiff Demons who joined the Central South Division of the Rugby League Conference in 2001. The Demons, who were mainly made up of former players from the university UWIC rugby league club, were quite successful and instantly saw interest from other parts of Wales grow.

In 2002, two former students of Swansea University decided to set up a local club called the Swansea Bulls, now Swansea Valley Miners (Neville Price), with a view to playing friendly matches against the Demons and other touring clubs. Peter Thomas and Gareth Jones, both former Welsh student internationals, started an amateur team out of the Morriston RFC ground with a mixture of university and local union players. Junior teams soon started playing league and one team, coached by Neville Price, was coached by the Bradford Bulls team coaches on a weekend tour.

=== First All-Welsh Competition ===
The following year in 2003, the RLC expanded, creating the Welsh Premier Division (now the South Wales Premiership). The inaugural competition had six open-age sides.

The record attendance for any rugby league game in Wales was set in 2005, with 74,213 attending the Challenge Cup final at the Millennium Stadium, Cardiff.

The Rugby Football League (RFL) took an entire round of Super League matches to the Millennium Stadium in Cardiff in May 2007. This was called Millennium Magic.

Celtic Crusaders, based at Brewery Field, Bridgend, joined Super League in 2009. A second Welsh team then joined the RFL professional leagues in 2010, South Wales Scorpions, playing at The Gnoll in Neath. Crusaders were liquidated after finishing bottom in 2011, replaced at the same ground by North Wales Crusaders, and relegated to RFL League One.

In 2012 the North Wales Conference was formed.

South Wales moved to Llanelli become the West Wales Raiders in 2018 League 1 season. West West Wales withdrew from the league after 2022, leaving the Crusaders as Wales' sole professional rugby league team, now based at Eirias Stadium, Colwyn Bay.

In recent years, due to the increase in popularity of league in Wales, there have been efforts to present the South Wales Premiership and North Wales Conference as first tier competitions within Wales and not just a fifth tier UK league. As of 2023, winners of both sides will play in the first all Welsh grand final for a place in the Challenge Cup, previously only available to South Welsh teams.

== Governing body ==
In 1907, the Welsh Northern Union was formed in Wrexham, but the Rugby Football League refused affiliation as they wanted the body located in South Wales, and the WNU soon folded.

In 1926, the newly renamed Rugby Football League formed a Welsh commission in an attempt to convert rugby union clubs to rugby league, but only succeeded in creating a single new club, Pontypridd.

The Wales Rugby League was formed in 1995 and recognised at that time as the governing body of rugby league in Wales by the Rugby Football League, the British Amateur Rugby League Association and the Welsh Sports Association. Wales Rugby League achieved governing body status in 2005 and employed its first professional chairman, Mark Rowley, in 2006.

Wales became the 12th full member of the Rugby League International Federation following a meeting of the Federation board in Melbourne in May 2010.

== Welsh professional clubs ==
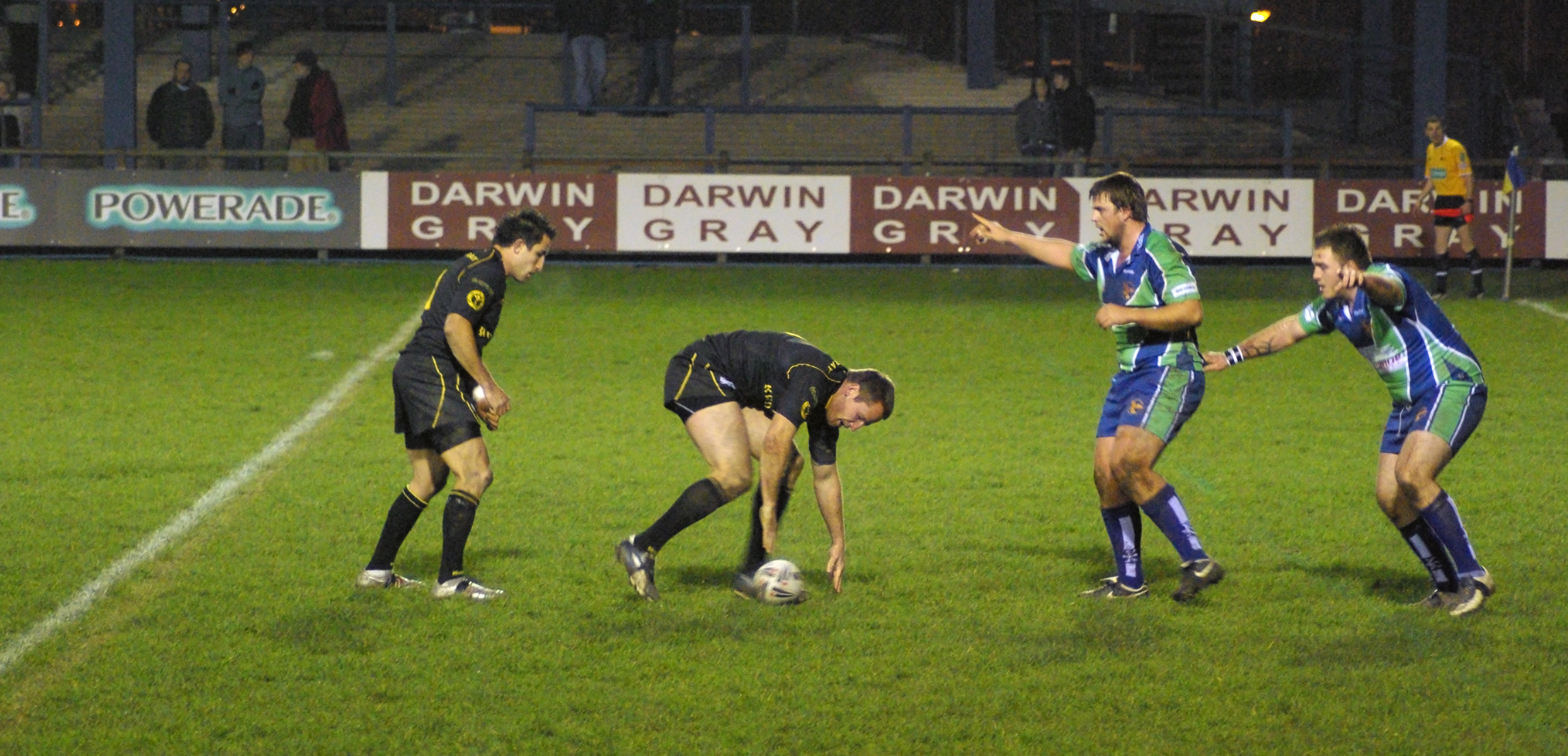
Celtic Crusaders (black) are the only Welsh club to have competed in the Super League, having done so between 2009 and 2011.

There have been various attempts to introduce professional rugby league to Wales throughout the 20th century. Merthyr Tydfil and Ebbw Vale joined for the 1907–08 season; followed closely behind Aberdare, Barry, Mid-Rhondda and Treherbert a year later. The 1908–09 season saw the six clubs grouped into the first Welsh League, played alongside the Northern Union League. Aberdare, Barry and Mid-Rhondda all lasted a single season, and Treherbert's resignation after the 1909–10 season season signalled the end of the Welsh League. Merthyr Tydfil resigned from the NRFU after the 1910–11 season, with Ebbw Vale, the sole remaining Welsh club, resigning after the 1911–12 season.

The next Welsh club was Pontypridd, who joined in 1926; only to drop out after early the following season. Cardiff RLFC participated in 1951–52, but disbanded after that season.

Following the example of Fulham FC (who founded the RL team that is now London Broncos), Cardiff City FC entered a team in 1981. The Blue Dragons shared Ninian Park with the Bluebirds until 1984, when the club went into liquidation after three successive mid-table finishes in the second division. The club moved to Brewery Field, Bridgend for the 1984–85 season, finishing bottom, and were expelled before the start of the next season for failing to obtain a home ground.

South Wales finished sixth in the Second Division in their sole season in the third division in 1996.

Celtic Crusaders joined second division in 2006 based at Brewery Field, Bridgend. After winning the division in 2007, the club were admitted to Super League in 2009. After finishing bottom in a competition where relegation was removed, Crusaders moved to the Racecourse Ground, Wrexham. A second Welsh team then joined the RFL professional leagues in 2010, South Wales Scorpions, playing at The Gnoll in Neath. both Welsh clubs made their respective league's playoffs in 2010, and both were eliminated in the opening round. Crusaders were liquidated after finishing bottom in 2011, replaced at the same ground by North Wales Crusaders, and relegated to RFL League One. The new Crusaders club won the division and promotion in 2013, but were relegated the following year due to a division restructure. South Wales were renamed the Ironmen in 2017, and moved to Llanelli to become the West Wales Raiders in 2018 League 1 season. West Wales withdrew from the league after the 2022 League 1 season, winning only two matches since their rebranding, and leaving the Crusaders as Wales' sole professional rugby league team. Crusaders currently play home matches at Eirias Stadium in Colwyn Bay.

=== Current RFL and BARLA teams ===
The following is a list of current Welsh rugby league clubs along with the league they play in:

Men's

- North Wales Crusaders (Championship)
- Conwy Celts, Dee Valley Dragons, Flintshire Falcons, Prestatyn and Rhyl Panthers, Wrexham Bradley Raiders (North Wales Conference)
- Aber Valley Wolves, Aberavon Fighting Irish, Bridgend Blue Bulls, Cardiff Blue Dragons, Cynon Valley Cavaliers, South Wales Jets, Torfaen Tigers, Rhondda Outlaws (South Wales Premiership)

Women's

- Cardiff Demons (RFL Women's Championship)

== Competitions and League System ==
=== Senior ===
Club rugby league in Wales is played in a full British league system operated by the Rugby Football League. The South Wales Conference and North Wales Conference are the highest tier exclusive Welsh division of the league system and are currently 5th tier in the league pyramid. Wales currently has one professional club which competes in the RFL, North Wales Crusaders.

=== Junior ===
Wales's junior competition is the Welsh Conference Junior League. In 2011 there was a North Wales Under 12 league. In the Conference Youth League there were two Welsh sides: North Wales Crusaders and CPC Bears.

== National team ==
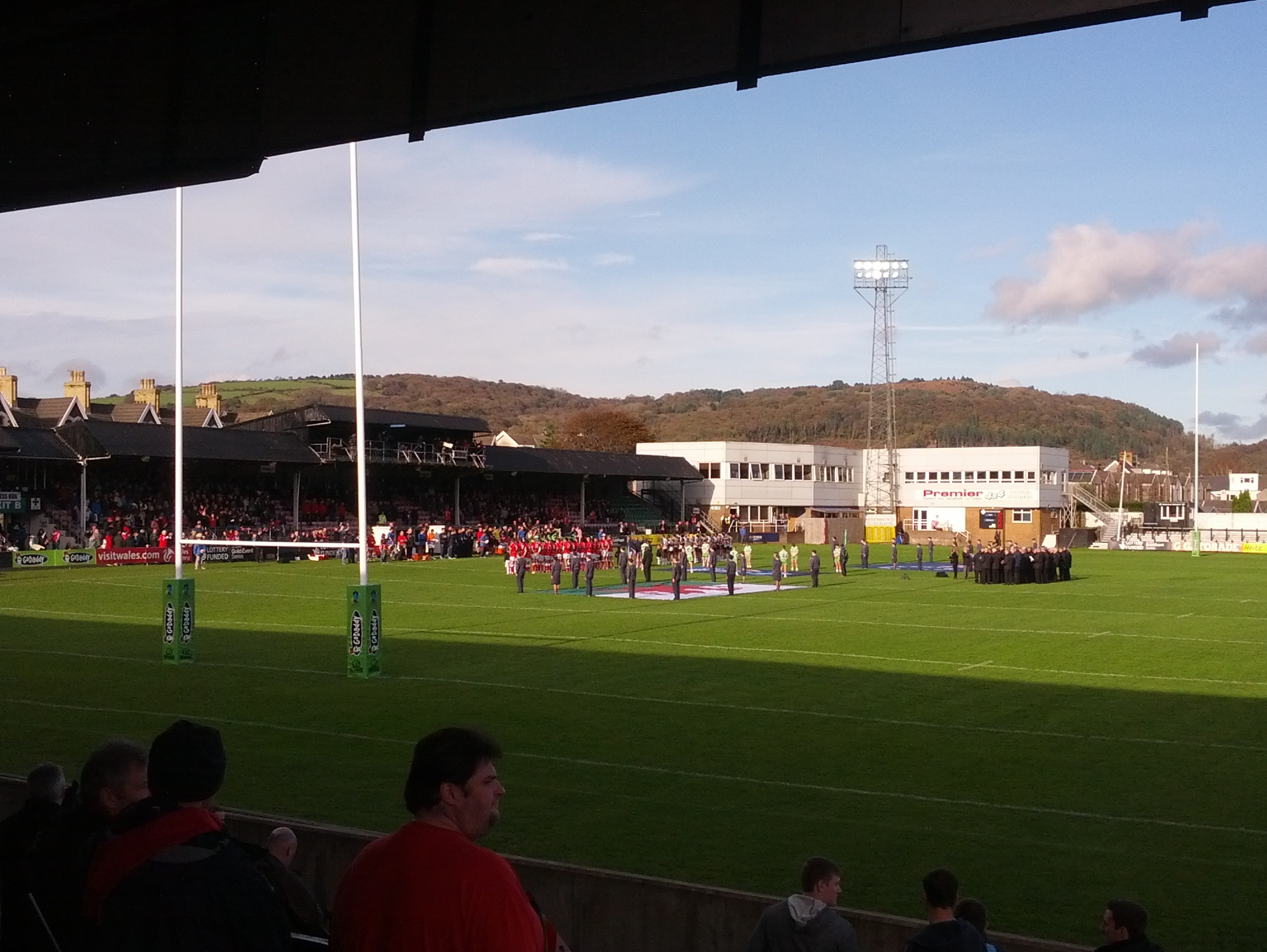
Wales vs The Cook Islands at the 2013 Rugby League World Cup

Wales participated in the first ever rugby league international, defeating New Zealand 9–8 at Athletic Ground, Aberdare on 1 January 1908 in front of 15,000 spectators, the winning try scored by former Wales rugby union international Dai Jones.

The national side, nicknamed the Dragons, have often been one of the stronger sides in international rugby league and have also provided a number of players for the Great Britain team. The two great eras of Welsh Rugby League coincide with the playing careers of Jim Sullivan and Jonathan Davies. They compete in the Rugby League European Nations Cup and the Rugby League World Cup.

The Wales Dragonhearts team is selected from domestic Welsh players, and won the Rugby League Amateur Four Nations eight times between 2002 and the final tournament in 2013.

Wales also play in regular international tournaments at under 19, under 15 and student level.

== Media ==
BBC Sport own the rights to broadcast a highlights package called the Super League Show which was first broadcast in Wales in 2008. Prior to this it had only been broadcast in the North of England. Rugby League Raw is not broadcast in Wales despite the BBC owning the rights to do so. The BBC covers the Rugby League Challenge Cup from the rounds in which the top clubs enter.

Highlights of Crusaders games were shown on the rugby union programme ScrumV and their home games can be seen on Y Clwb Rygbi 13 on S4C. The BBC covers the Rugby League Challenge Cup from the rounds in which the top clubs enter.

BBC Radio 5 Live and BBC Radio 5 Sports Extra carry commentary from a selection of Super League matches each week. GTFM carries a weekly rugby league spot throughout the season on their Saturday afternoon "The Season Ticket" show.

Live Super League and National Rugby League games are shown on Sky Sports Arena with highlights also being shown on the channel. From the 2022 season, 10 live Super League games per season will be shown on Channel 4, the first time the league will be shown on terrestrial television. Championship games are shown on Premier Sports, with one game a week being aird.

== See also ==
- Rugby league in the British Isles
- British Rugby League Hall of Fame
- List of Wales national rugby league team players
- Wales national rugby league team match results
