= Wales Rugby League =

Governing body of rugby league in Wales

- Rygbi Cynghrair Cymru
- Founded: 1995
- IRL affiliation: Full member
- RLEF affiliation: Full member
- Responsibility: Wales
- Headquarters: The Gnoll, Neath
- Key people: Janet Ryder, Simon Weston (Patron); Mike Nicholas (2003-) (President); James Davies (2023-) (Chair) Richard Hibbard (2024-) (Chief Executive)
- Men's coach: Paul Berry (2025-)
- Women's coach: Thomas Brindle (2021-)
- Website: https://wrl.wales/

(Wales)
- As of 22 April 2024

Wales Rugby League is the national governing body for rugby league football in Wales.

In 1907 The Welsh Northern Rugby Football Union was formed in Wrexham, but the English Northern Rugby Football Union refused it affiliation as they wanted the body located in the south of Wales and the Welsh body soon folded.

In 1926 the English body, now called the Rugby Football League (RFL) formed a Welsh commission in an attempt to convert rugby union clubs to rugby league. The Wales Rugby League was founded in 1995 and achieved governing body status in 2005 and employed its first professional chairman, Mark Rowley, in 2006. The WRL is responsible for the running of the game in Wales, for organising games and competitions and for selecting the squad for the national teams. In addition to managing professional and amateur national representative senior teams, WRL runs several age grade international sides from under 13s to a student team. The senior teams each play in annual European competitions, and the professional side compete in the World Cup every 4 years.

In 2006 the WRL achieved autonomous status from the Rugby Football League. In 2010, at a meeting of the Rugby League International Federation in Melbourne, Australia, the WRL were made full members of the Federation.

WRL has 14 affiliated clubs, including five university clubs. Wales Rugby League is based at The Gnoll the home of Neath RFC in Neath.

The national team took part in the 2011 Gillette Four Nations tournament against Australia, England and New Zealand.

The under 19s contingent, consisting of players from South Wales Scorpions and North Wales Crusaders, won the bronze medal at the inaugural Commonwealth Rugby League Championships, which took place in June 2014 in Glasgow. The gold medal was won by Papua New Guinea, with Australia winning silver.

Former France and England head coach, John Kear, took over from Iestyn Harris as national head coach on 16 July 2014, a role he undertook alongside his coaching role at Championship side Batley. His first games in charge were during the European Championships in Autumn 2014. Following the resignation of John Kear in June 2025, former Wales U16 Head Coach Paul Berry was named as the new Head Coach of the Men's National side, assisted by former international Damien Gibson and assistant U16 coach Liam Bostock.

Wales qualified for the 2017 World Cup in Australia, through beating Italy away in a playoff for the 2nd European spot. By finishing 2nd in the 2018 European Championship behind France and defeating Ireland 30–8 in Wrexham, they earned automatic qualification for the 2021 World Cup in England. Wales will also field a wheelchair side in the accompanying tournament. In 2019 they took part in the Rugby League World Cup 9s tournament in Australia.

In September 2025, a controversy arose in regards to head coach Paul Berry's squad selection for their end-of-season test series against Ireland. Which involved Wales's most capped player Rhys Williams being informed that he had been left out of the squad via voicemail. Chief Executive Richard Hibbard defended the head coach's selection decision, stating "no player is guaranteed a place based on past achievements" and criticised Williams along with other senior players for poor professionalism in regards to "first concerns focused on compensation". Williams responded to this by stating the intent was to ensure him and the other part time players from semi-professional clubs did not end up out of pocket by playing for their country.

== See also ==
- Rugby Football League
- British Amateur Rugby League Association
- Wales national rugby league team
- Rugby league in Wales
- Rugby League Conference
- North Wales League (rugby league)
- Rugby League Conference Welsh Premier
